= Willie's Magic Wand =

- Directed by: Walter R. Booth
- Production company: Charles Urban Trading Company
- Release date: July 1907
- Running time: 2 mins 45 secs extent
- Country: United Kingdom
- Language: Silent

Willie's Magic Wand is a 1907 British silent comic trick film, directed by Walter R. Booth, featuring a young boy terrorising the household with his father's magic wand.

Similar to "earlier trick films The Haunted Curiosity Shop and Undressing Extraordinary (both 1901)", this is, according to Michael Brooke of BFI Screenonline, "essentially a series of [loosely linked] special-effects set pieces", but "the print in the National Film and Television Archive is incomplete, omitting amongst other things a come-uppance where Willie is punished for his misdemeanours by being turned into a girl, thus depriving him of more than one magic wand".

A clip from the film is featured in Paul Merton's interactive guide to early British silent comedy How They Laughed on the BFI website.
