= Cinema of the United Kingdom =

- No. of screens: 4,749 (2023)
  - Per capita: 7.0 per 100,000 (2023)
- Main distributors: Walt Disney Studios Motion Pictures; Warner Bros. StudioCanal; Universal Pictures; Pathé; Paramount Pictures; Lionsgate

Produced feature films (2017)
- Total: 285
- Fictional: 213 (74.7%)
- Animated: 5 (1.8%)
- Documentary: 66 (23.2%)

Number of admissions (2023)
- Total: 123,600,000
  - Per capita: 1.8

Gross box office (2023)
- Total: £994 million
- National films: £406 million (40.8%)

British cinema has significantly influenced the global film industry since the 19th century. The oldest known surviving film in the world, Roundhay Garden Scene (1888), was shot in England by French inventor Louis Le Prince. Early colour films were also pioneered in the UK. Film production reached an all-time high in 1936, but the "golden age" of British cinema is usually thought to have occurred in the 1940s, which saw the release of the most critically acclaimed works by filmmakers such as David Lean, Michael Powell, and Carol Reed.

Many British actors have accrued critical success and worldwide recognition, including Alec Guinness, Patrick Stewart, Julie Andrews, Michael Caine, Joan Collins, Sean Connery, Olivia Colman, Benedict Cumberbatch, Daniel Craig, Daniel Day-Lewis, Judi Dench, Helen Mirren, Olivia de Havilland, Audrey Hepburn, Anthony Hopkins, Glynis Johns, Vivien Leigh, Ian Mckellen, Peter O'Toole, Gary Oldman, Laurence Olivier, John Gielgud, Maggie Smith, Joan Plowright, Emma Thompson, Alan Rickman,Rachel Weisz, Kate Winslet and Keira Knightley. Some of the films with the largest ever box office profits have been made in the United Kingdom, including Harry Potter and James Bond, the fourth and fifth highest-grossing film franchises of all time.

The identity of British cinema, particularly in relation to the cinema of the United States, has been the subject of various debates over the years. Its history includes competition as well as collaboration with the United States cinema in production of a huge number of film projects. British filmmakers such as Alfred Hitchcock, Christopher Nolan, and Ridley Scott achieved success combining their work with the United States filmmakers as well, as did British performers such as Charlie Chaplin and Cary Grant.

In 2009, British films grossed around $2 billion worldwide and achieved a market share of around 7% globally and 17% in the United Kingdom. UK box office earnings totalled £1.1 billion in 2012, with 172.5 million admissions. The British Film Institute has produced a poll ranking what it considers to be the 100 greatest British films of all time. The annual BAFTA Awards hosted by the British Academy of Film and Television Arts are considered to be the British equivalent of the Academy Awards.

== History ==
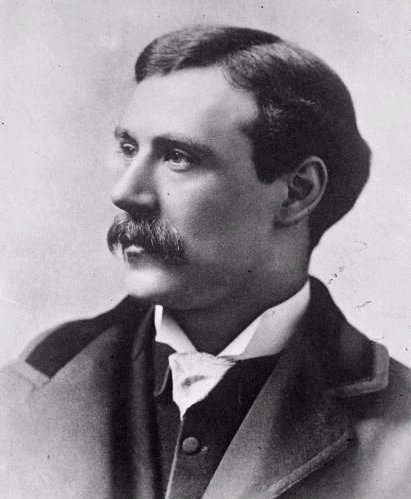
William Friese-Greene

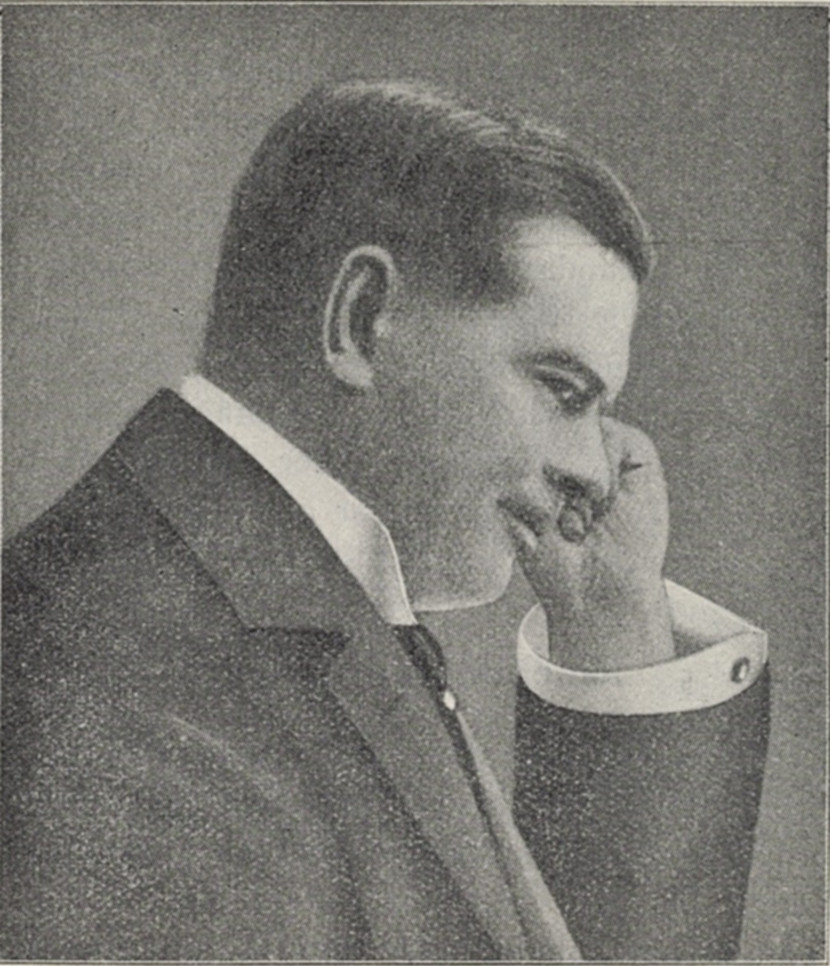
Charles Urban, 1914

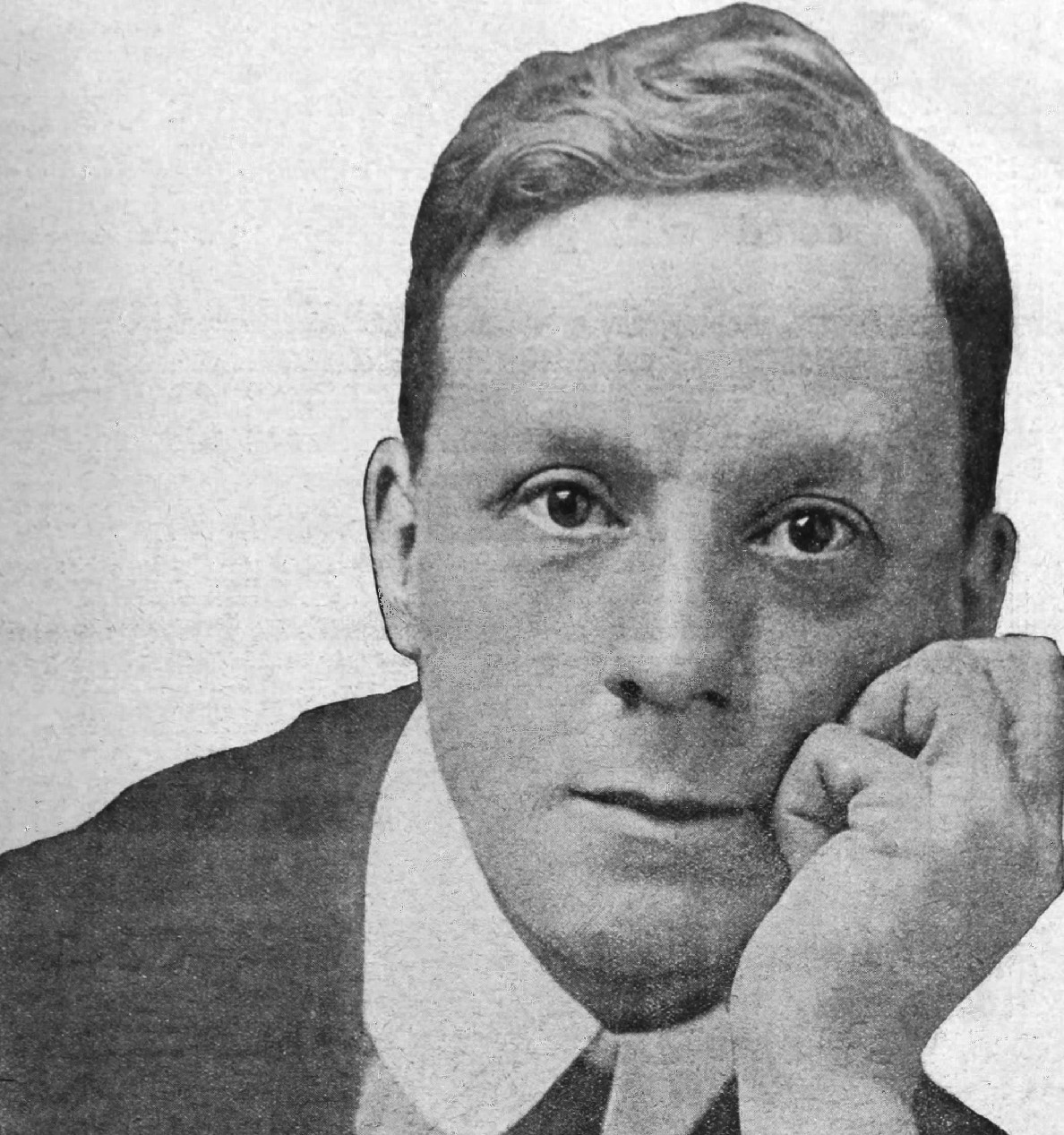
Cecil Hepworth

Sir Oswald Stoll, 1922

=== Origins and silent films ===
The world's first moving picture was shot in Leeds by Louis Le Prince in 1888 and the first moving pictures developed on celluloid film were made in Hyde Park, London in 1889 by British inventor William Friese Greene, who patented the process in 1890.

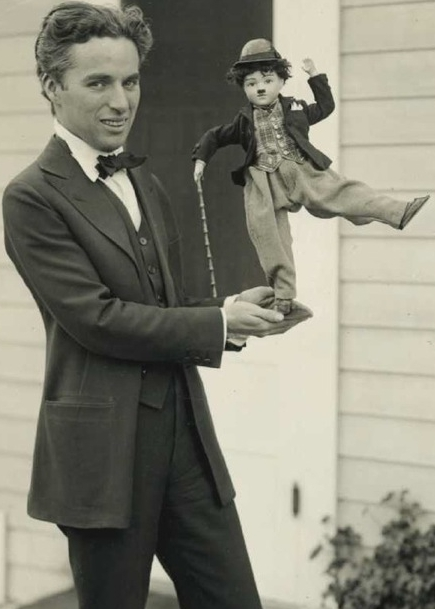
Charlie Chaplin, c. 1918

The first people to build and run a working 35 mm camera in Britain were Robert W. Paul and Birt Acres. They made the first British film Incident at Clovelly Cottage in February 1895, shortly before falling out over the camera's patent. Soon several British film companies had opened to meet the demand for new films, such as Mitchell and Kenyon in Blackburn. The Lumière brothers first brought their show to London in 1896. In 1898, American producer Charles Urban expanded the London-based Warwick Trading Company to produce British films, mostly documentary and news.

Although the earliest British films were of everyday events, the early 20th century saw the appearance of narrative shorts, mainly comedies and melodramas. The early films were often melodramatic in tone, and there was a distinct preference for story lines already known to the audience, in particular, adaptations of Shakespeare plays and Dickens novels.

In 1898, Gaumont-British Picture Corp. was founded as a subsidiary of the French company Gaumont, constructing Lime Grove Studios in West London in 1915 in the first building built in Britain solely for film production. Also in 1898, Hepworth Studios was founded in Lambeth, South London by Cecil Hepworth, the Bamforths began producing films in Yorkshire, and William Haggar began producing films in Wales.

Directed by Walter R. Booth in 1901, Scrooge, or, Marley's Ghost is the earliest film adaptation of Charles Dickens's festive novella A Christmas Carol. Booth's The Hand of the Artist (1906) has been described as the first British animated film.

In 1902, Ealing Studios was founded by Will Barker. It has become the oldest continuously operating film studio in the world.

In 1902, the earliest colour film in the world was made; capturing everyday events. In 2012, it was found by the National Science and Media Museum in Bradford after lying forgotten in an old tin for 110 years. The previous title for earliest colour film, using Urban's inferior Kinemacolor process, was thought to date from 1909. The re-discovered films were made by pioneer Edward Raymond Turner from London who patented his process on 22 March 1899.

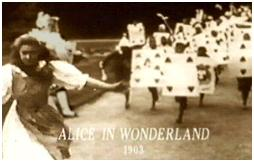
Screenshot from the first film version of Alice in Wonderland (1903)

In 1909, Urban formed the Natural Color Kinematograph Company, which produced early colour films using his patented Kinemacolor process. This was later challenged in court by Greene, causing the company to go out of business in 1914.

In 1903, Cecil Hepworth and Percy Stow directed Alice in Wonderland, the first film adaptation of Lewis Carroll's children's book Alice's Adventures in Wonderland. Also in 1903, Frank Mottershaw of Sheffield produced the film A Daring Daylight Robbery, which launched the chase genre.

In 1911, the Ideal Film Company was founded in Soho, London, distributing almost 400 films by 1934, and producing 80.

In 1913, stage director Maurice Elvey began directing British films, becoming Britain's most prolific film director, with almost 200 by 1957.

In 1914, Elstree Studios was founded, and acquired in 1928 by German-born Ludwig Blattner, who invented a magnetic steel tape recording system that was adopted by the BBC in 1930.

In 1915, the Kinematograph Renters’ Society of Great Britain and Ireland was formed to represent the film distribution companies. It is the oldest film trade body in the world. It was known as the Society of Film Distributors until it changed its name again to the Film Distributors’ Association (FDA).

During the 1918-1920 Spanish Influenza pandemic, cinema was seen as a way to take ameliorative action, causing many health professionals to see cinema as one of the primary ways the flu spread, as there was an absence of ventilation in the cinemas. There was an outcry to "Shut the Kinemas," and uneven, localized restrictions were put in place, primarily focusing on children and servicemen, including barring them from the theatre outright or requiring a 2.5 hour break each day.

In 1920, Gaumont opened Islington Studios, where Alfred Hitchcock got his start, selling out to Gainsborough Pictures in 1927. Also in 1920 Cricklewood Studios was founded by Sir Oswald Stoll, becoming Britain's largest film studio, known for Fu Manchu and Sherlock Holmes film series.

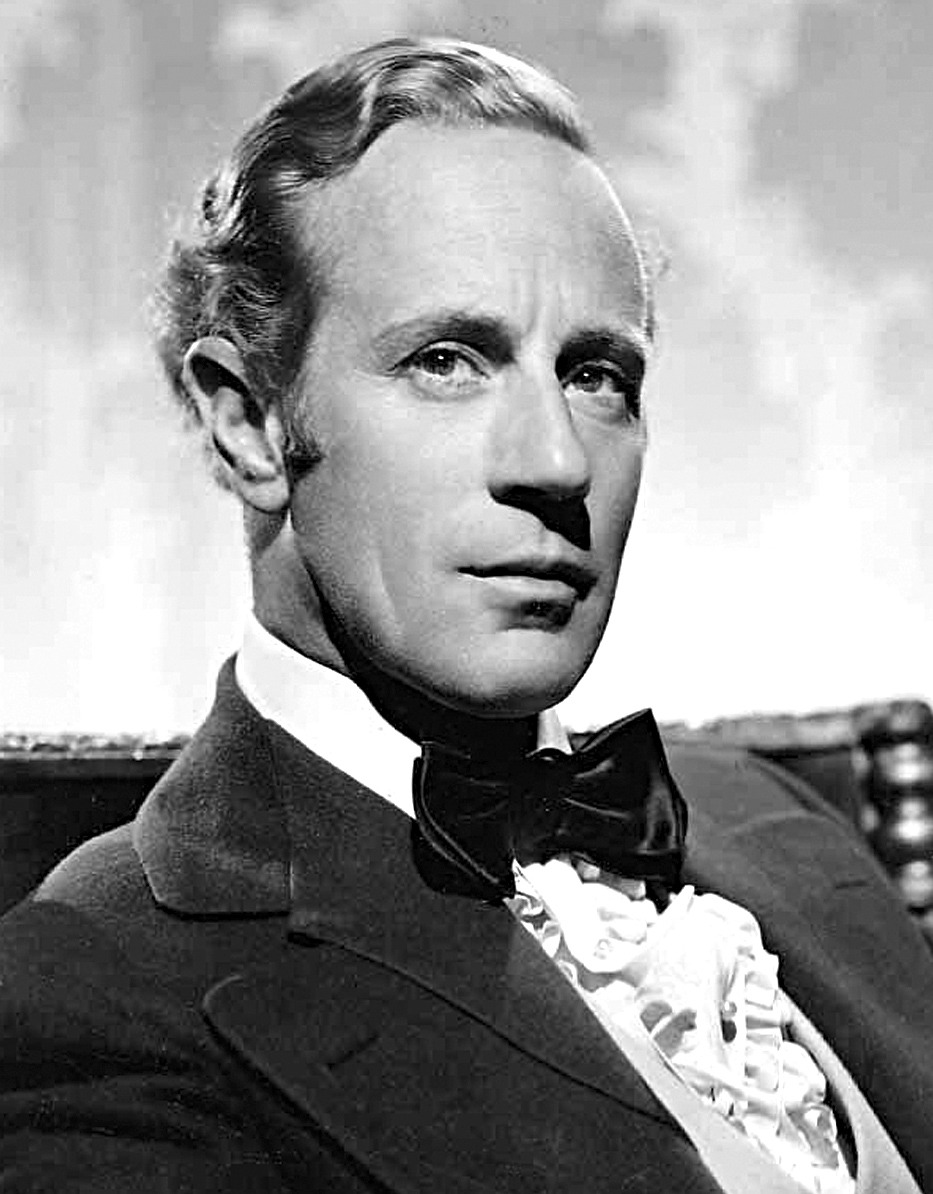
Leslie Howard

In 1920, the short-lived company Minerva Films was founded in London by the actor Leslie Howard (also producer and director) and his friend and story editor Adrian Brunel. Some of their early films include four written by A. A. Milne including The Bump, starring C. Aubrey Smith; Twice Two; Five Pound Reward; and Bookworms.

By the mid-1920s the British film industry was losing out to heavy competition from the United States, which was helped by its much larger home market – in 1914 25% of films shown in the UK were British, but by 1926 this had fallen to 5%. A slump in 1924 caused many British film studios to close, resulting in the passage of the Cinematograph Films Act 1927 to boost local production, requiring that cinemas show a certain percentage of British films. The act was technically a success, with audiences for British films becoming larger than the quota required, but it had the effect of creating a market for poor quality, low cost films, made to satisfy the quota. The "quota quickies", as they became known, are often blamed by historians for holding back the development of the industry. However, some British film makers, such as Michael Powell, learnt their craft making such films. The act was modified with the Cinematograph Films Act 1938 assisted the British film industry by specifying only films made by and shot in Great Britain would be included in the quota, an act that severely reduced Canadian and Australian film production.

The biggest star of the silent era, English comedian Charlie Chaplin, was Hollywood-based.

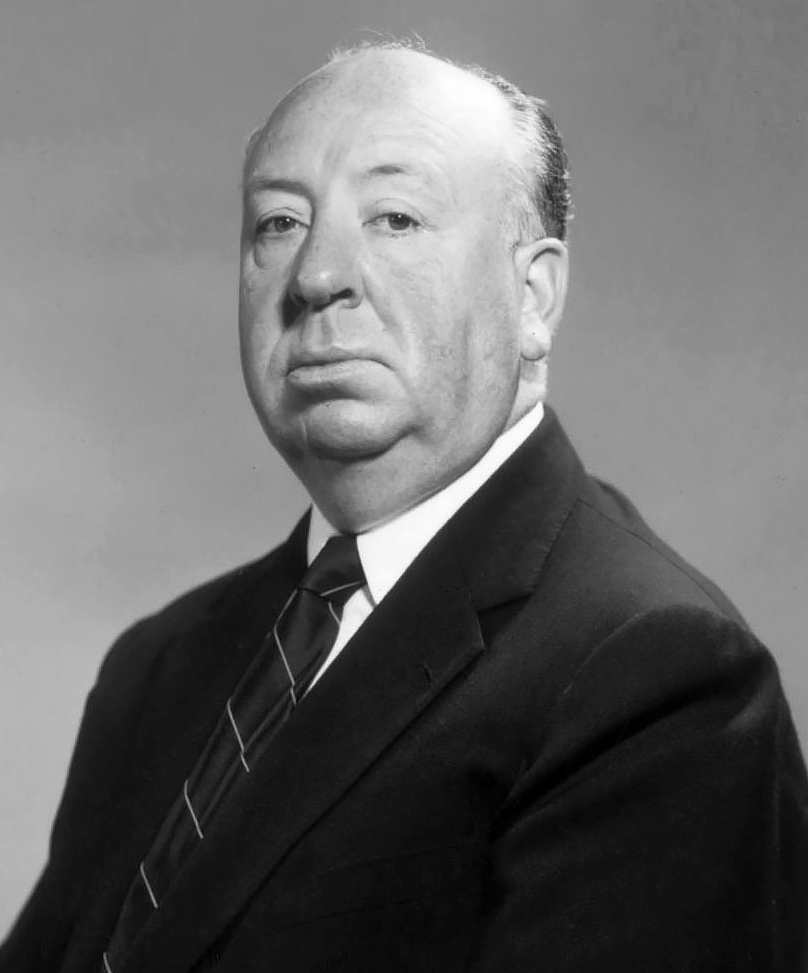
Alfred Hitchcock established himself as a name director with his first thriller, The Lodger: A Story of the London Fog (1927).

=== The early sound period ===
Scottish solicitor John Maxwell founded British International Pictures (BIP) in 1927. Based at the former British National Pictures Studios in Elstree, the facilities original owners, including producer-director Herbert Wilcox, had run into financial difficulties. One of the company's early films, Alfred Hitchcock's Blackmail (1929), is often regarded as the first British sound feature. It was a part-talkie with a synchronised score and sound effects. Earlier in 1929, the first all-talking British feature, The Clue of the New Pin was released. It was based on a novel by Edgar Wallace, starring Donald Calthrop, Benita Home and Fred Raines, which was made by British Lion at their Beaconsfield Studios. John Maxwell's BIP became the Associated British Picture Corporation (ABPC) in 1933. ABPC's studios in Elstree came to be known as the "porridge factory", according to Lou Alexander, "for reasons more likely to do with the quantity of films that the company turned out, than their quality". Elstree (strictly speaking almost all the studios were in neighbouring Borehamwood) became the centre of the British film industry, with six film complexes over the years all in close proximity to each other.

By 1927, the largest cinema chains in the United Kingdom consisted of around 20 cinemas but the following year Gaumont-British expanded significantly to become the largest, controlling 180 cinemas by 1928 and up to 300 by 1929. Maxwell formed ABC Cinemas in 1927 which became a subsidiary of BIP and went on to become one of the largest in the country, together with Odeon Cinemas, founded by Oscar Deutsch, who opened his first cinema in 1928. By 1937, these three chains controlled almost a quarter of all cinemas in the country. A booking by one of these chains was indispensable for the success of any British film.

With the advent of sound films, many foreign actors were in less demand, with English received pronunciation commonly used; for example, the voice of Czech actress Anny Ondra in Blackmail was substituted by an off-camera Joan Barry during Ondra's scenes.

Starting with John Grierson's Drifters (also 1929), the period saw the emergence of the school of realist Documentary Film Movement, from 1933 associated with the GPO Film Unit. It was Grierson who coined the term "documentary" to describe a non-fiction film, and he produced the movement's most celebrated early films, Night Mail (1936), written and directed by Basil Wright and Harry Watt, and incorporating the poem by W. H. Auden towards the end of the short.

Music halls also proved influential in comedy films of this period, and a number of popular personalities emerged, including George Formby, Gracie Fields, Jessie Matthews and Will Hay. These stars often made several films a year, and their productions remained important for morale purposes during World War II.

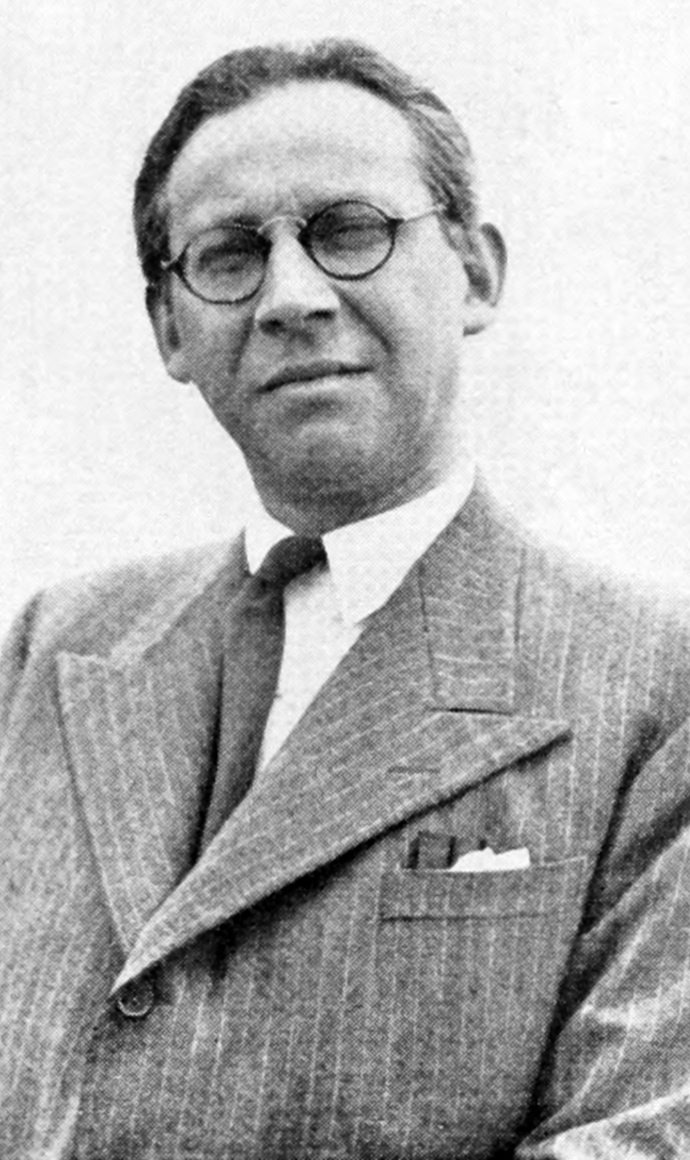
Alexander Korda

Many of the British films with larger budgets during the 1930s were produced by London Films, founded by Hungarian emigre Alexander Korda. The success of The Private Life of Henry VIII (1933), made at British and Dominions Elstree Studios, persuaded United Artists and The Prudential to invest in Korda's Denham Film Studios, which opened in May 1936, but both investors suffered losses as a result. Korda's films before the war included Things to Come, Rembrandt (both 1936) and Knight Without Armour (1937), as well as the early Technicolour films The Drum (1938) and The Four Feathers (1939). These had followed closely on from Wings of the Morning (1937), the UK's first three-strip Technicolour feature film, made by the local offshoot of 20th Century Fox. Although some of Korda's films indulged in "unrelenting pro-Empire flag waving", those featuring Sabu turned him into "a huge international star"; "for many years" he had the highest profile of any actor of Indian origin. Paul Robeson was also cast in leading roles when "there were hardly any opportunities" for African Americans "to play challenging roles" in their own country's productions.

In 1933, the British Film Institute was established as the lead organisation for film in the UK. They set up the National Film Library in 1935 (now known as the BFI National Archive), with Ernest Lindgren as its curator.

In 1934, J. Arthur Rank became a co-founder of British National Films Company and they helped create Pinewood Studios, which opened in 1936. Also in 1936, Rank took over General Film Distributors and in 1937, Rank founded The Rank Organisation. In 1938, General Film Distributors became affiliated with Odeon Cinemas.

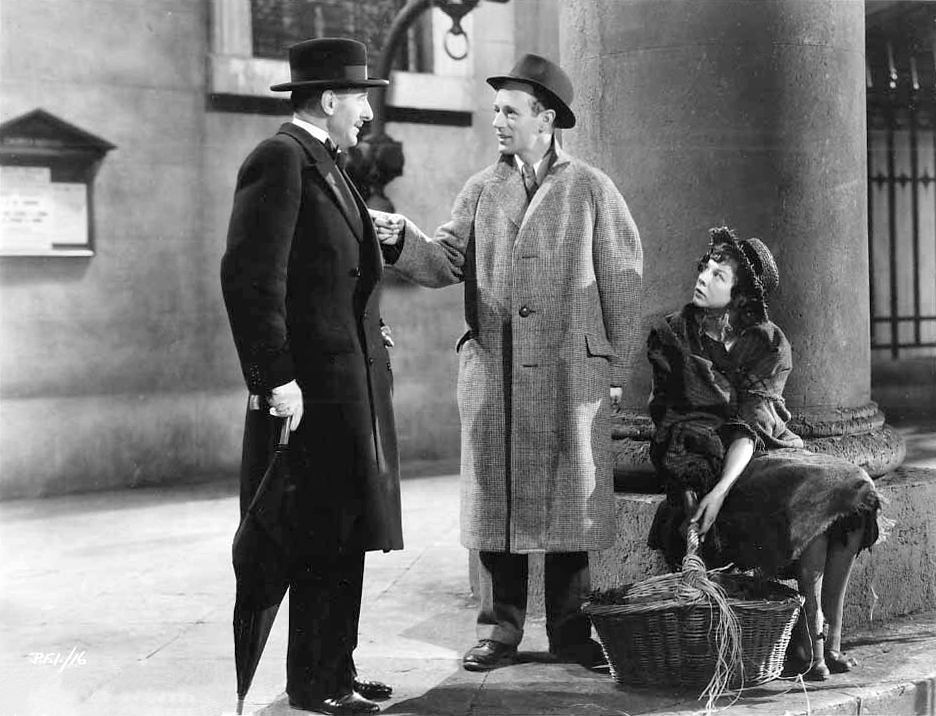
Scott Sunderland, Leslie Howard and Wendy Hiller in Pygmalion (1938)

Rising expenditure and over-optimistic expectations of expansion into the American market caused a financial crisis in 1937, after an all-time high of 192 films were released in 1936. Of the 640 British production companies registered between 1925 and 1936, only 20 were still active in 1937. Moreover, the Cinematograph Films Act 1927 was up for renewal. The replacement Cinematograph Films Act 1938 provided incentives, via a "quality test", for UK companies to make fewer films, but of higher quality, and to eliminate the "quota quickies". Influenced by world politics, it encouraged American investment and imports. One result was the creation of MGM-British, an English subsidiary of the largest American studio, which produced four films before the war, including Goodbye, Mr. Chips (1939).

The new venture was initially based at Denham Studios. Korda himself lost control of the facility in 1939 to the Rank Organisation. Circumstances forced Korda's The Thief of Bagdad (1940), a spectacular fantasy film, to be completed in California, where Korda continued his film career during the war.

By now contracted to Gaumont British, Alfred Hitchcock had settled on the thriller genre by the mid-1930s with The Man Who Knew Too Much (1934), The 39 Steps (1935) and The Lady Vanishes (1938). Lauded in Britain where he was dubbed "Alfred the Great" by Picturegoer magazine, Hitchcock's reputation was beginning to develop overseas, with a New York Times feature writer asserting; "Three unique and valuable institutions the British have that we in America have not. Magna Carta, the Tower Bridge and Alfred Hitchcock, the greatest director of screen melodramas in the world." Hitchcock was then signed up to a seven-year contract by Selznick and moved to Hollywood.

=== Second World War ===
"The idea of a nation of devoted cinema-goers is inextricably linked with the number of classic films released during the war years. This was British cinema’s ‘golden age’, a period in which filmmakers such as Humphrey Jennings, David Lean, Powell and Pressburger, and Carol Reed came to the fore."

Published in The Times on 5 September 1939, two days after Britain declared war on Germany, George Bernard Shaw's letter protested against a government order to close all places of entertainment, including cinemas. 'What agent of Chancellor Hitler is it who has suggested that we should all cower in darkness and terror "for the duration"?'. Within two weeks of the order cinemas in the provinces were reopened, followed by central London within a month. In 1940, cinema admissions figures rose, to just over 1 billion for the year, and they continued rising to over 1.5 billion in 1943, 1944 and 1945.

Humphrey Jennings began his career as a documentary film maker just before the war, in some cases working in collaboration with co-directors. London Can Take It (with Harry Wat, 1940) detailed the Blitz while Listen to Britain (with Stewart McAllister, 1942) looked at the home front. The Crown Film Unit, part of the Ministry of Information took over the responsibilities of the GPO Film Unit in 1940. Paul Rotha and Alberto Cavalcanti were colleagues of Jennings. British films began to make use of documentary techniques; Cavalcanti joined Ealing for Went the Day Well? (1942),

Many other films helped to shape the popular image of the nation at war. Among the best known of these films are In Which We Serve (1942), We Dive at Dawn (1943), Millions Like Us (1943) and The Way Ahead (1944). The war years also saw the emergence of The Archers partnership between director Michael Powell and the Hungarian-born writer-producer Emeric Pressburger with films such as The Life and Death of Colonel Blimp (1943) and A Canterbury Tale (1944).

Two Cities Films, an independent production company releasing their films through a Rank subsidiary, also made some important films, including the Noël Coward and David Lean collaborations This Happy Breed (1944) and Blithe Spirit (1945) as well as Laurence Olivier's Henry V (1944). By this time, Gainsborough Studios were releasing their series of critically derided but immensely popular period melodramas, including The Man in Grey (1943) and The Wicked Lady (1945). New stars, such as Margaret Lockwood and James Mason, emerged in the Gainsborough films.

=== Post-war cinema ===
Towards the end of the 1940s, the Rank Organisation became the dominant force behind British film-making, having acquired a number of British studios and the Gaumont chain (in 1941) to add to its Odeon Cinemas. Rank's serious financial crisis in 1949, a substantial loss and debt, resulted in the contraction of its film production. In practice, Rank maintained an industry duopoly with ABPC (later absorbed by EMI) for many years.

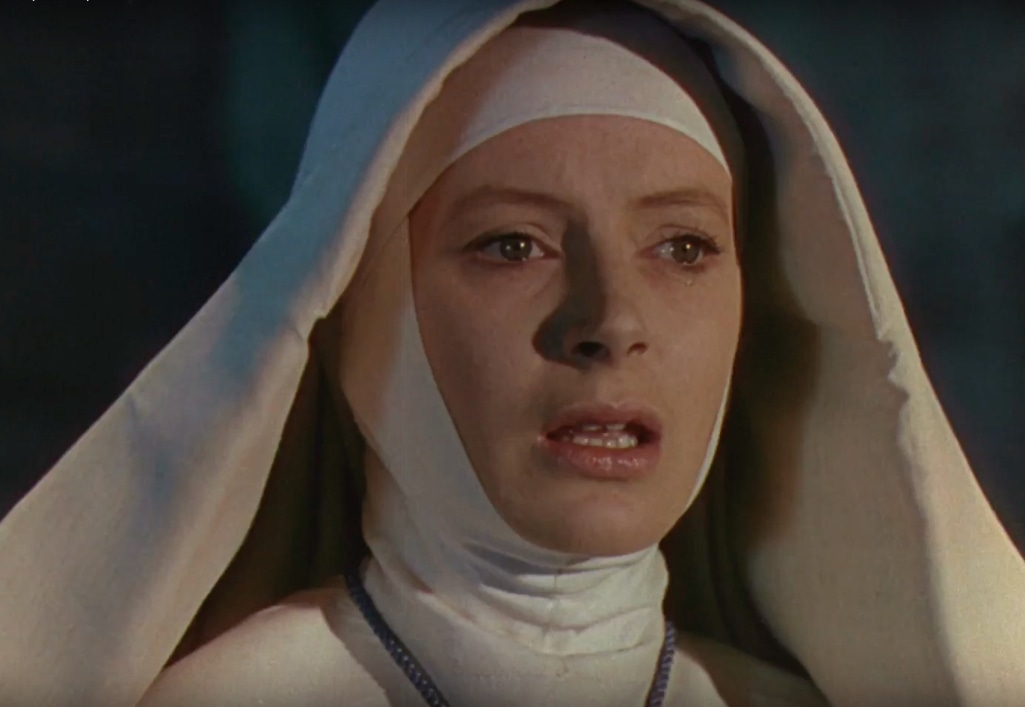
Deborah Kerr as Sister Clodagh in Black Narcissus (1947)

For the moment, the industry hit new heights of creativity in the immediate post-war years. Among the most significant films produced during this period were David Lean's Brief Encounter (1945) and his Dickens adaptations Great Expectations (1946) and Oliver Twist (1948), Ken Annakin's comedy Miranda (1948) starring Glynis Johns, Carol Reed's thrillers Odd Man Out (1947) and The Third Man (1949), and Powell and Pressburger's A Matter of Life and Death (1946), Black Narcissus (1947) and The Red Shoes (1948), the most commercially successful film of its year in the United States. Laurence Olivier's Hamlet (also 1948), was the first non-American film to win the Academy Award for Best Picture. Ealing Studios (financially backed by Rank) began to produce their most celebrated comedies, with three of the best remembered films, Whisky Galore (1948), Kind Hearts and Coronets and Passport to Pimlico (both 1949), being on release almost simultaneously. Their portmanteau horror film Dead of Night (1945) is also particularly highly regarded.

Under the Import Duties Act 1932, HM Treasury levied a 75% tariff on all film imports on 6 August 1947 which became known as Dalton Duty (after Hugh Dalton then the Chancellor of the Exchequer). The tax came into effect on 8 August, applying to all imported films, of which the overwhelming majority came from the United States; American film studio revenues from the UK had been in excess of US$68 million in 1946. The following day, 9 August, the Motion Picture Association of America announced that no further films would be supplied to British cinemas until further notice. The Dalton Duty was ended on 3 May 1948 with the American studios again exported films to the UK though the Marshall Plan prohibited US film companies from taking foreign exchange out of the nations their films played in.

Following the Cinematograph Film Production (Special Loans) Act 1949, the National Film Finance Corporation (NFFC) was established as a British film funding agency.

The Eady Levy, named after Sir Wilfred Eady was a tax on box office receipts in the United Kingdom in order to support the British Film industry. It was established in 1950 coming into effect in 1957. A direct governmental payment to British-based producers would have qualified as a subsidy under the terms of the General Agreement on Tariffs and Trade, and would have led to objections from American film producers. An indirect levy did not qualify as a subsidy, and so was a suitable way of providing additional funding for the UK film industry whilst avoiding criticism from abroad.

In 1951, the National Film Theatre was initially opened in a temporary building at the Festival of Britain. It moved to its present location on the South Bank in London for the first London Film Festival on 16 October 1957 run by the BFI.

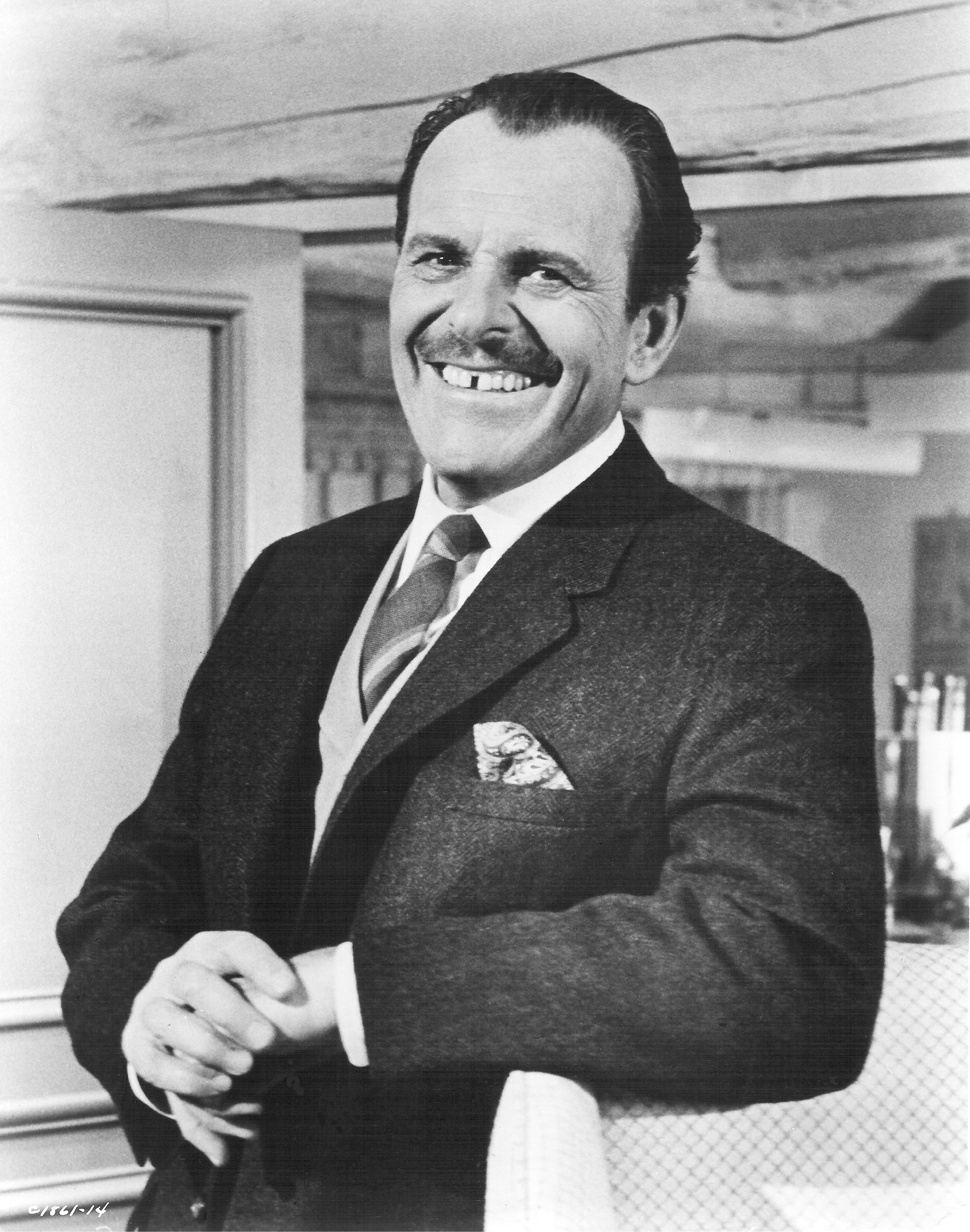
Terry-Thomas starred with Peter Sellers in four films between 1957 and 1959. Their last film, I'm All Right Jack, was the highest-grossing film at the British box office in 1960.

During the 1950s, the British industry began to concentrate on popular comedies and World War II dramas aimed more squarely at the domestic audience. The war films were often based on true stories and made in a similar low-key style to their wartime predecessors. They helped to make stars of actors like John Mills, Jack Hawkins and Kenneth More. Some of the most successful included The Cruel Sea (1953), The Dam Busters (1954), The Colditz Story (1955) and Reach for the Sky (1956).

The Rank Organisation produced some comedy successes, such as Genevieve (1953). The writer/director/producer team of twin brothers John and Roy Boulting also produced a series of successful satires on British life and institutions, beginning with Private's Progress (1956), and continuing with (among others) Brothers in Law (1957), Carlton-Browne of the F.O. (1958), and I'm All Right Jack (1959). Starring in School for Scoundrels (1960), the British Film Institute thought Terry-Thomas was "outstanding as a classic British bounder".

Popular comedy series included the "Doctor" series, beginning with Doctor in the House (1954). The series originally starred Dirk Bogarde, probably the British industry's most popular star of the 1950s, though later films had Michael Craig and Leslie Phillips in leading roles. The Carry On series began in 1958 with regular instalments appearing for the next twenty years. The Italian director-producer Mario Zampi also made a number of successful black comedies, including Laughter in Paradise (1951), The Naked Truth (1957) and Too Many Crooks (1958). Ealing Studios had continued its run of successful comedies, including The Lavender Hill Mob (1951) and The Ladykillers (1955), but the company ceased production in 1958, after the studios had already been bought by the BBC.

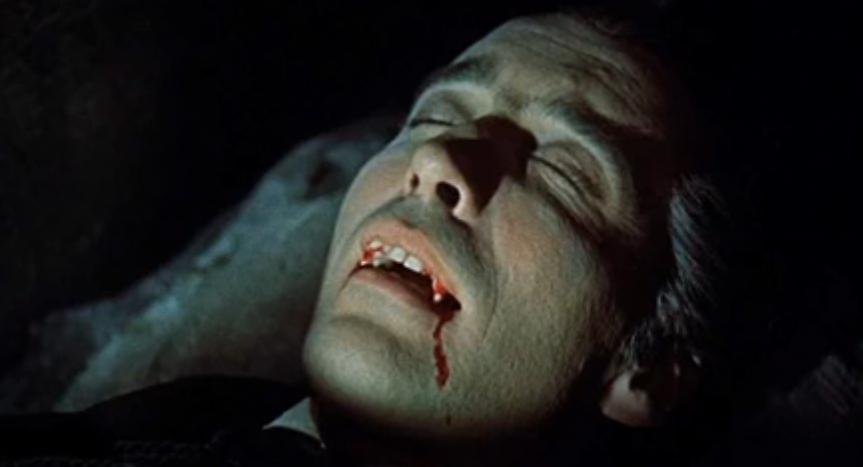
Christopher Lee in Dracula (1958)

Less restrictive censorship towards the end of the 1950s encouraged film producer Hammer Films to embark on their series of commercially successful horror films. Beginning with adaptations of Nigel Kneale's BBC science fiction serials The Quatermass Experiment (1955) and Quatermass II (1957), Hammer quickly graduated to The Curse of Frankenstein (1957) and Dracula (1958), both deceptively lavish and the first gothic horror films in colour. The studio turned out numerous sequels and variants, with English actors Peter Cushing and Christopher Lee being the most regular leads. Peeping Tom (1960), a now highly regarded thriller, with horror elements, set in the contemporary period, was badly received by the critics at the time, and effectively finished the career of Michael Powell, its director.

=== Social realism ===
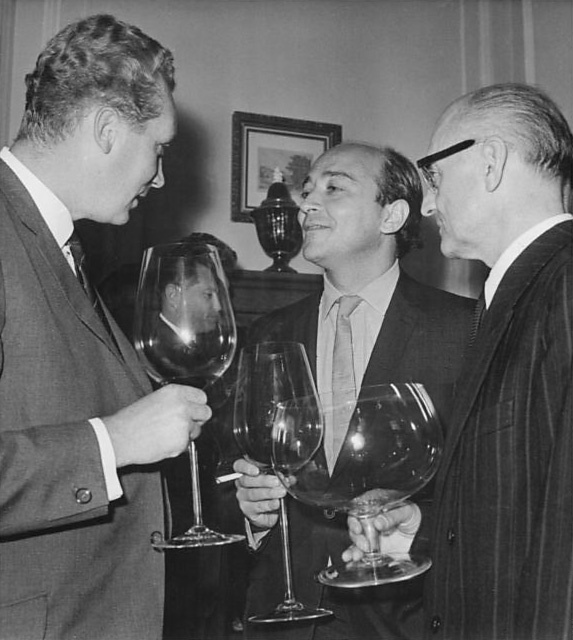
Karel Reisz (centre) who was active in the Free Cinema and the 'British New Wave'

The British New Wave film makers attempted to produce social realist films (see also 'kitchen sink realism') attempted in commercial feature films released between around 1959 and 1963 to convey narratives about a wider spectrum of people in Britain than the country's earlier films had done. These individuals, principally Karel Reisz, Lindsay Anderson and Tony Richardson, were also involved in the short lived Oxford film journal Sequence and the "Free Cinema" documentary film movement. The 1956 statement of Free Cinema, the name was coined by Anderson, asserted: "No film can be too personal. The image speaks. Sounds amplifies and comments. Size is irrelevant. Perfection is not an aim. An attitude means a style. A style means an attitude." Anderson, in particular, was dismissive of the commercial film industry. Their documentary films included Anderson's Every Day Except Christmas, among several sponsored by Ford of Britain, and Richardson's Momma Don't Allow. Another member of this group, John Schlesinger, made documentaries for the BBC's Monitor arts series.

Together with future James Bond co-producer Harry Saltzman, dramatist John Osborne and Tony Richardson established the company Woodfall Films to produce their early feature films. These included adaptations of Richardson's stage productions of Osborne's Look Back in Anger (1959), with Richard Burton, and The Entertainer (1960) with Laurence Olivier, both from Osborne's own screenplays. Such films as Reisz's Saturday Night and Sunday Morning (also 1960), Richardson's A Taste of Honey (1961), Schlesinger's A Kind of Loving (1962) and Billy Liar (1963), and Anderson's This Sporting Life (1963) are often associated with a new openness about working-class life or previously taboo issues.

The team of Basil Dearden and Michael Relph, from an earlier generation, "probe[d] into the social issues that now confronted social stability and the establishment of the promised peacetime consensus". Pool of London (1950). and Sapphire (1959) were early attempts to create narratives about racial tensions and an emerging multi-cultural Britain. Dearden and Relph's Victim (1961), was about the blackmail of homosexuals. Influenced by the Wolfenden report of four years earlier, which advocated the decriminalising of homosexual sexual activity, this was "the first British film to deal explicitly with homosexuality". Unlike the New Wave film makers though, critical responses to Dearden's and Relph's work have not generally been positive.

=== The 1960s ===
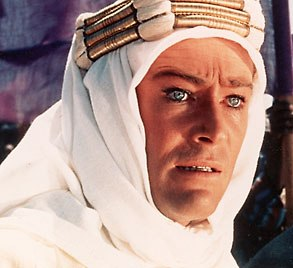
Peter O'Toole in Lawrence of Arabia (1962)

As the 1960s progressed, American studios returned to financially supporting British films, especially those that capitalised on the "swinging London" image propagated by Time magazine in 1966. Films like Darling, The Knack ...and How to Get It (both 1965), Alfie and Georgy Girl (both 1966), all explored this phenomenon. Blowup (also 1966), and later Women in Love (1969), showed female and then male full-frontal nudity on screen in mainstream British films for the first time.

At the same time, film producers Harry Saltzman and Albert R. Broccoli combined sex with exotic locations, casual violence and self-referential humour in the phenomenally successful James Bond series with Sean Connery in the leading role. The first film Dr. No (1962) was a sleeper hit in the UK and the second, From Russia with Love (1963), a hit worldwide. By the time of the third film, Goldfinger (1964), the series had become a global phenomenon, reaching its commercial peak with Thunderball the following year. The series' success led to a spy film boom with many Bond imitations. Bond co-producer Saltzman also instigated a rival series of more realistic spy films based on the novels of Len Deighton. Michael Caine starred as bespectacled spy Harry Palmer in The Ipcress File (1965), and two sequels in the next few years. Other more downbeat espionage films were adapted from John le Carré novels, such as The Spy Who Came In from the Cold (1965) and The Deadly Affair (1966).

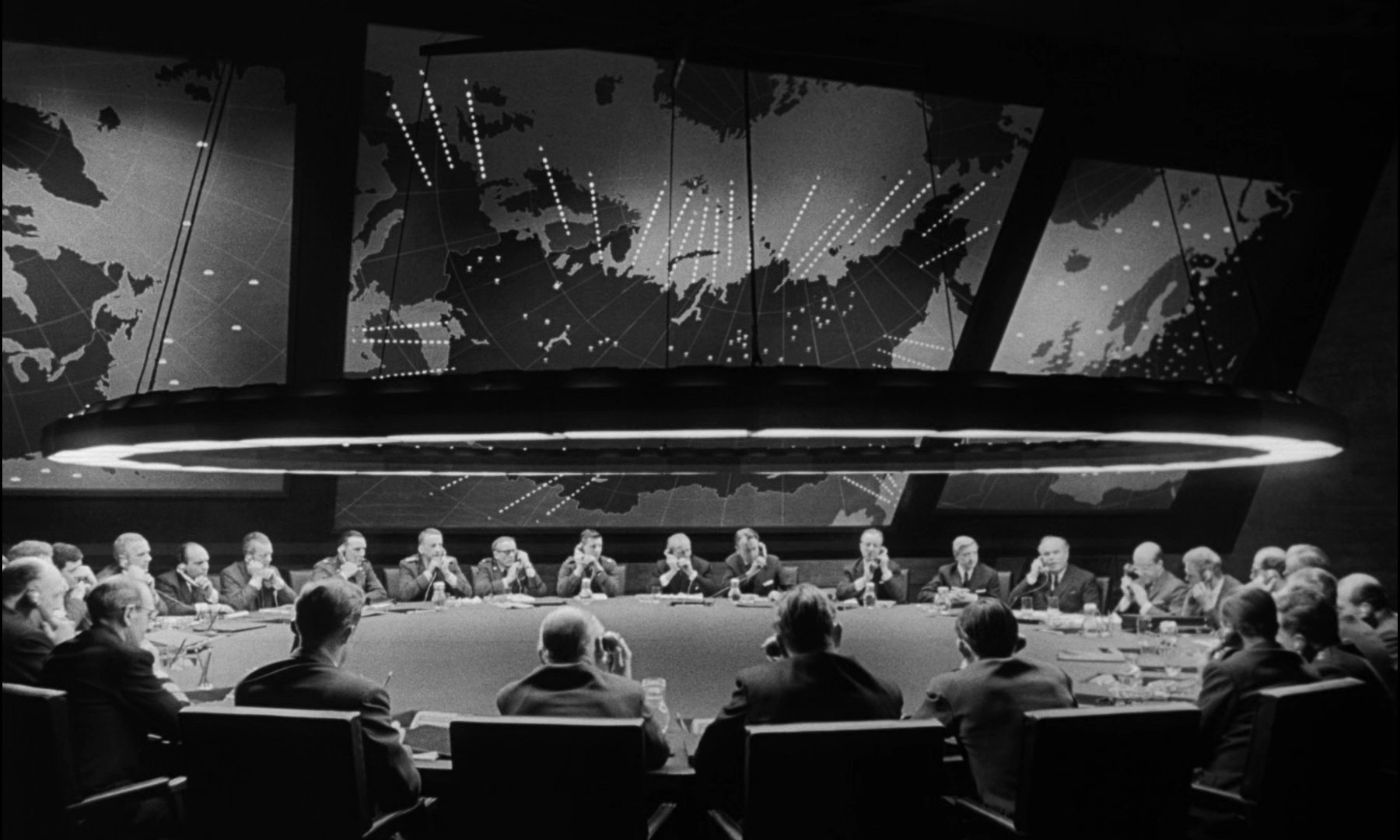
The war room in Dr. Strangelove (1963) was designed by Ken Adam.

American directors were regularly working in London throughout the decade, but several became permanent residents in the UK. Blacklisted in America, Joseph Losey had a significant influence on British cinema in the 1960s, particularly with his collaborations with playwright Harold Pinter and leading man Dirk Bogarde, including The Servant (1963) and Accident (1967). Voluntary exiles Richard Lester and Stanley Kubrick were also active in the UK. Lester had major hits with The Beatles film A Hard Day's Night (1964) and The Knack ...and How to Get It (1965) and Kubrick with Dr. Strangelove (1963) and 2001: A Space Odyssey (1968). While Kubrick settled in Hertfordshire in the early 1960s and would remain in England for the rest of his career, these two films retained a strong American influence. Other films of this era involved prominent filmmakers from elsewhere in Europe, Repulsion (1965) and Blowup (1966) were the first English language films of the Polish director Roman Polanski and the Italian Michelangelo Antonioni respectively.

Historical films as diverse as Lawrence of Arabia (1962), Tom Jones (1963), and A Man for All Seasons (1966) benefited from the investment of American studios. Major films like Becket (1964), Khartoum (1966) and The Charge of the Light Brigade (1968) were regularly mounted, while smaller-scale films, including Accident (1967), were big critical successes. Four of the decade's Academy Award winners for best picture were British productions, including six Oscars for the film musical Oliver! (1968), based on the Charles Dickens novel Oliver Twist.

After directing several contributions to the BBC's Wednesday Play anthology series, Ken Loach began his feature film career with the social realist Poor Cow (1967) and Kes (1969). Meanwhile, the controversy around Peter Watkins The War Game (1965), which won the Best Documentary Film Oscar in 1967, but had been suppressed by the BBC who had commissioned it, would ultimately lead Watkins to work exclusively outside Britain.

=== 1970s ===
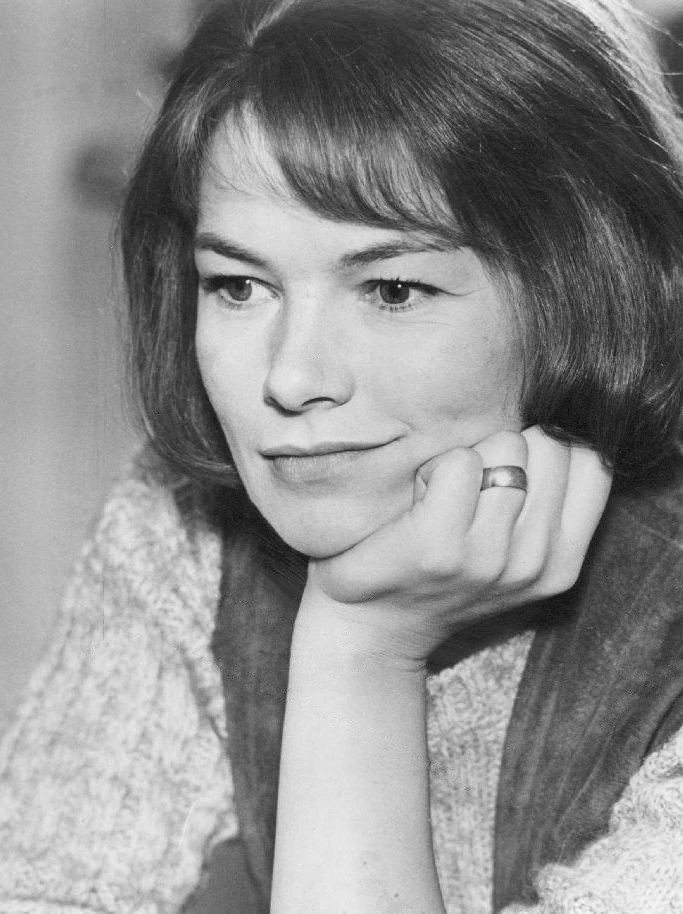
Glenda Jackson in 1971

American studios cut back on British productions, and in many cases withdrew from financing them altogether. Films financed by American interests were still being made, including Billy Wilder's The Private Life of Sherlock Holmes (1970), but for a time funds became hard to come by.

More relaxed censorship also brought several controversial films, including Nicolas Roeg and Donald Cammell's Performance, Ken Russell's The Devils (1971), Sam Peckinpah's Straw Dogs (1971), and Stanley Kubrick's A Clockwork Orange (1971) starring Malcolm McDowell as the leader of a gang of thugs in a dystopian future Britain.

Other films during the early 1970s included the Edwardian drama The Go-Between (1971), which won the Palme d'Or at the Cannes Film Festival, Nicolas Roeg's Venice-set supernatural thriller Don't Look Now (1973) and Mike Hodges' gangster drama Get Carter (1971) starring Michael Caine. Alfred Hitchcock returned to Britain to shoot Frenzy (1972), Other productions such as Richard Attenborough's Young Winston (1972) and A Bridge Too Far (1977) met with mixed commercial success. The British horror film cycle associated with Hammer Film Productions, Amicus and Tigon drew to a close, despite attempts by Hammer to spice up the formula with added nudity and gore. Although some attempts were made to broaden the range of British horror films, such as with The Wicker Man (1973), these films made little impact at the box office, In 1976, British Lion, who produced The Wicker Man, were finally absorbed into the film division of EMI, who had taken over ABPC in 1969. The duopoly in British cinema exhibition, via Rank and now EMI, continued.

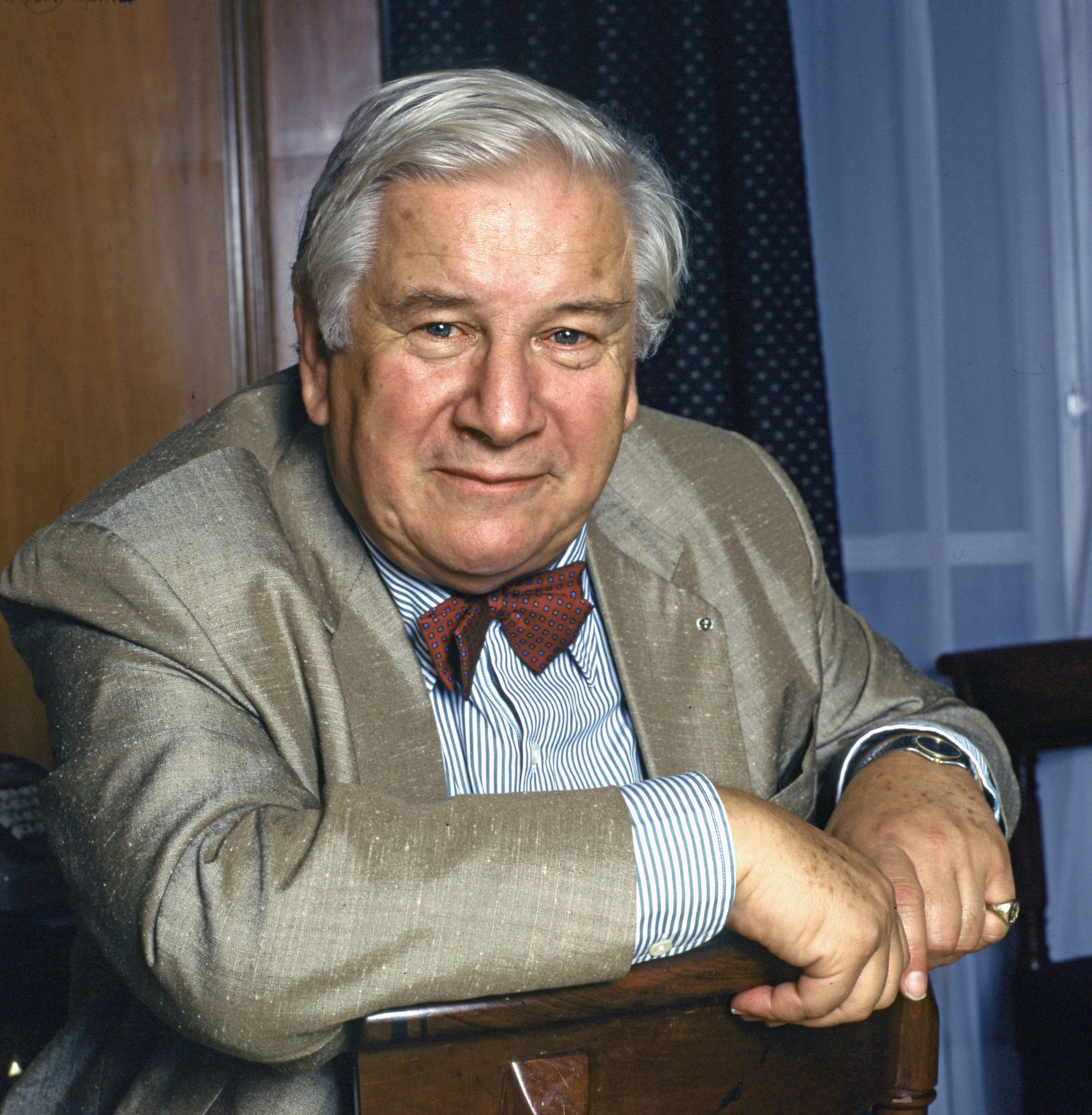
Peter Ustinov (pictured in 1986) starred as Hercule Poirot in Death on the Nile (1978).

In the early 1970s, the government reduced its funding of the National Film Finance Corporation so the NFFC started to operate as a consortium, including with banks, which led to them using more commercial criteria for funding British films rather than focusing on quality or new talent, moving to fund films based on TV shows such as Up Pompeii (1971).

Some other British producers, including Hammer, turned to television for inspiration, and big screen versions of popular sitcoms like On the Buses (1971) and Steptoe and Son (1972) proved successful with domestic audiences, the former had greater domestic box office returns in its year than the Bond film, Diamonds Are Forever and in 1973, an established British actor Roger Moore was cast as Bond in, Live and Let Die, it was a commercial success and Moore would continue the role for the next 12 years. Low-budget British sex comedies included the Confessions of ... series starring Robin Askwith, beginning with Confessions of a Window Cleaner (1974). More elevated comedy films came from the Monty Python team, also from television. Their two most successful films were Monty Python and the Holy Grail (1975) and Monty Python's Life of Brian (1979), the latter a major commercial success, probably at least in part due to the controversy at the time surrounding its subject.

Some American productions did return to the major British studios in 1977–79, including the original Star Wars (1977) at Elstree Studios, Superman (1978) at Pinewood, and Alien (1979) at Shepperton. Successful adaptations were made in the decade of the Agatha Christie novels Murder on the Orient Express (1974) and Death on the Nile (1978). The entry of Lew Grade's company ITC into film production in the latter half of the decade brought only a few box office successes and an unsustainable number of failures

=== 1980s ===
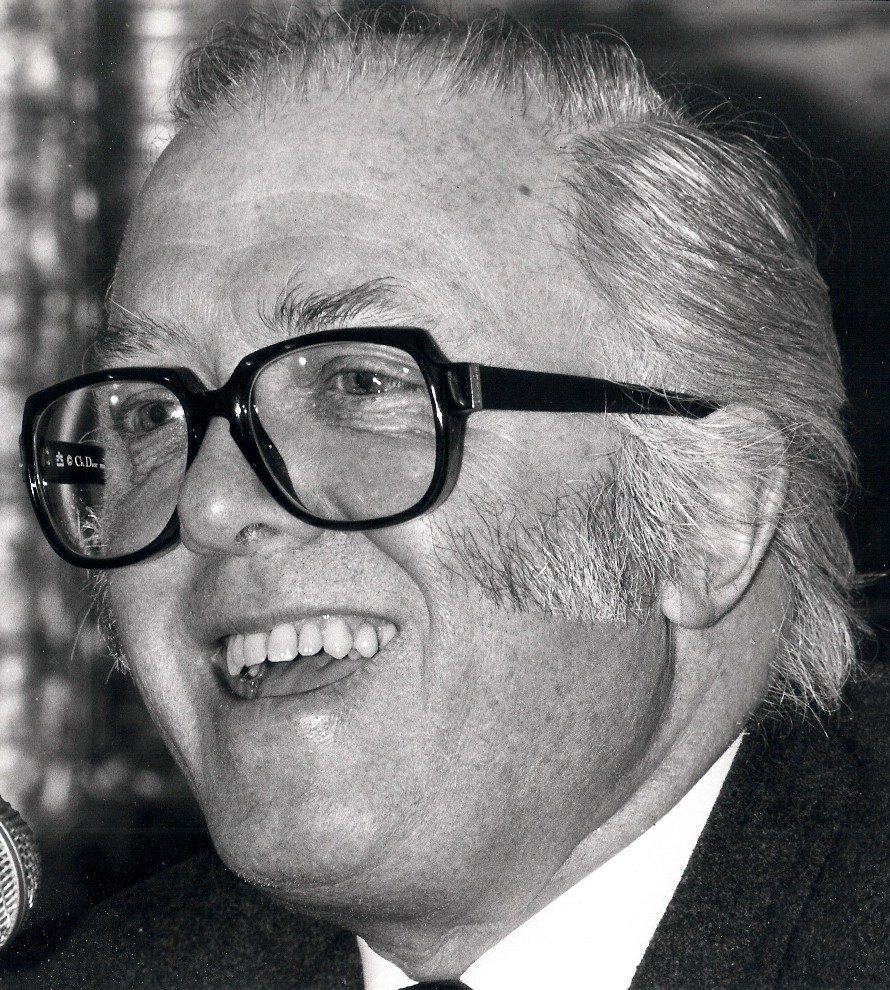
Richard Attenborough in 1983

In 1980, only 31 British films were made, a 50% decline from the previous year and the lowest number since 1914, and production fell again in 1981 to 24 films. The industry suffered further blows from falling cinema attendances, which reached a record low of 54 million in 1984, and the elimination of the 1957 Eady Levy, a tax concession, in the same year. The concession had made it possible for an overseas based film company to write off a large amount of its production costs by filming in the UK – this was what attracted a succession of big-budget American productions to British studios in the 1970s. These factors led to significant changes in the industry, with the profitability of British films now "increasingly reliant on secondary markets such as video and television, and Channel 4 ... [became] a crucial part of the funding equation."

With the removal of the levy, multiplex cinemas were introduced to the United Kingdom with the opening of a ten-screen cinema by AMC Cinemas at The Point in Milton Keynes in 1985 and the number of screens in the UK increased by around 500 over the decade leading to increased attendances of almost 100 million by the end of the decade.

The 1980s soon saw a renewed optimism, led by smaller independent production companies such as Goldcrest, HandMade Films and Merchant Ivory Productions.

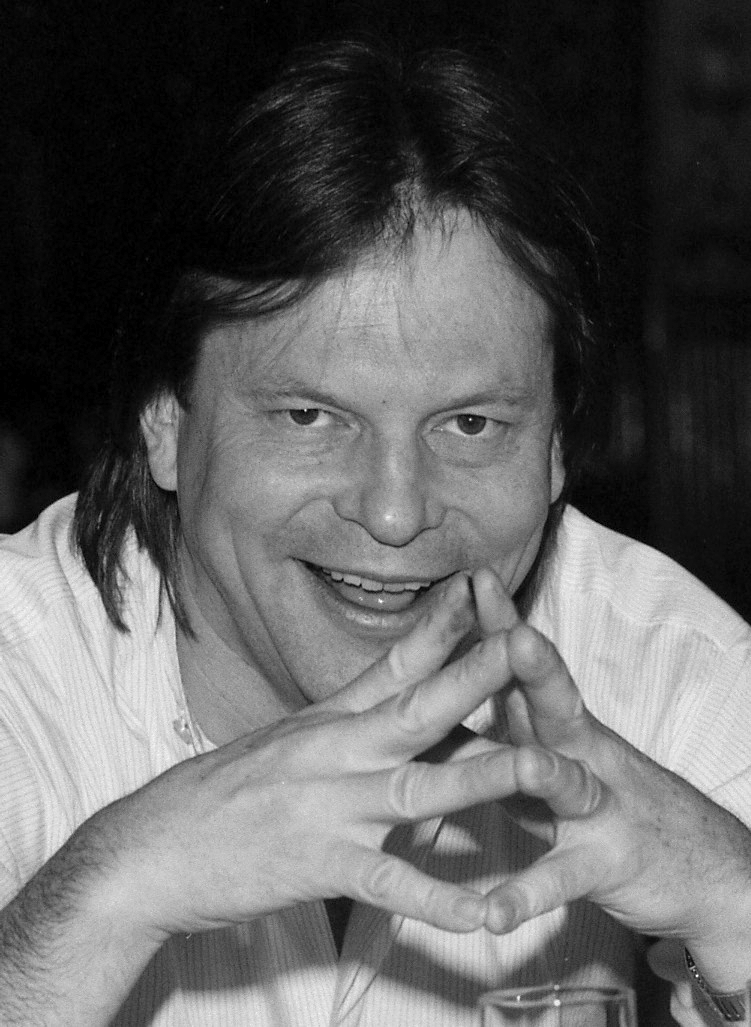
Terry Gilliam in 1985

Handmade Films, which was partly owned by George Harrison, was originally formed to take over the production of Monty Python's Life of Brian, after EMI's Bernard Delfont (Lew Grade's brother) had pulled out. Handmade also bought and released the gangster drama The Long Good Friday (1980), produced by a Lew Grade subsidiary, after its original backers became cautious. Members of the Python team were involved in other comedies during the decade, including Terry Gilliam's fantasy films Time Bandits (1981) and Brazil (1985), the black comedy Withnail & I (1987), and John Cleese's hit A Fish Called Wanda (1988), while Michael Palin starred in A Private Function (1984), from Alan Bennett's first screenplay for the cinema screen.

Goldcrest producer David Puttnam has been described as "the nearest thing to a mogul that British cinema has had in the last quarter of the 20th century." Under Puttnam, a generation of British directors emerged making popular films with international distribution. Some of the talent backed by Puttnam — Hugh Hudson, Ridley Scott, Alan Parker, and Adrian Lyne — had shot commercials; Puttnam himself had begun his career in the advertising industry. When Hudson's Chariots of Fire (1981) won 4 Academy Awards in 1982, including Best Picture, its writer Colin Welland declared "the British are coming!". When Gandhi (1982), another Goldcrest film, picked up a Best Picture Oscar, it looked as if he was right.

It prompted a cycle of period films – some with a large budget for a British film, such as David Lean's final film A Passage to India (1984), alongside the lower-budget Merchant Ivory adaptations of the works of E. M. Forster, such as A Room with a View (1986). But further attempts to make 'big' productions for the US market ended in failure, with Goldcrest losing its independence after Revolution (1985) and Absolute Beginners (1986) were commercial and critical flops. Another Goldcrest film, Roland Joffé's The Mission (also 1986), won the 1986 Palme d'Or, but did not go into profit either. Joffé's earlier The Killing Fields (1984) had been both a critical and financial success. These were Joffé's first two feature films and were amongst those produced by Puttnam.

Mainly outside the commercial sector, film makers from the new commonwealth countries had begun to emerge during the 1970s. Horace Ové's Pressure (1975) had been funded by the British Film Institute as was A Private Enterprise (1974), these being the first Black British and Asian British films, respectively. The 1980s however saw a wave of new talent, with films such as Franco Rosso's Babylon (1980), Menelik Shabazz's Burning an Illusion (1981) and Po-Chih Leong's Ping Pong (1986; one of the first films about Britain's Chinese community). Many of these films were assisted by the newly formed Channel 4, which had an official remit to provide for "minority audiences." Commercial success was first achieved with My Beautiful Laundrette (1985). Dealing with racial and gay issues, it was developed from Hanif Kureishi's first film script. My Beautiful Laundrette features Daniel Day-Lewis in a leading role. Day-Lewis and other young British actors who were becoming stars, such as Gary Oldman, Colin Firth, Tim Roth and Rupert Everett, were dubbed the Brit Pack.

With the involvement of Channel 4 in film production, talents from television moved into feature films with Stephen Frears (My Beautiful Laundrette) and Mike Newell with Dance with a Stranger (1985). John Boorman, who had been working in the US, was encouraged back to the UK to make Hope and Glory (1987). Channel Four also became a major sponsor of the British Film Institute's Production Board, which backed three of Britain's most critically acclaimed filmmakers: Derek Jarman (The Last of England, 1987), Terence Davies (Distant Voices, Still Lives, 1988), and Peter Greenaway; the latter of whom gained surprising commercial success with The Draughtsman's Contract (1982) and The Cook, the Thief, His Wife & Her Lover (1989). Stephen Woolley's company Palace Pictures also produced some successful films, including Neil Jordan's The Company of Wolves (1984) and Mona Lisa (1986), before collapsing amid a series of unsuccessful films. Amongst the other British films of the decade were Bill Forsyth's Gregory's Girl (1981) and Local Hero (1983), Lewis Gilbert's Educating Rita (1983), Peter Yates' The Dresser (1983) and Kenneth Branagh's directorial debut, Henry V (1989).

=== 1990s ===
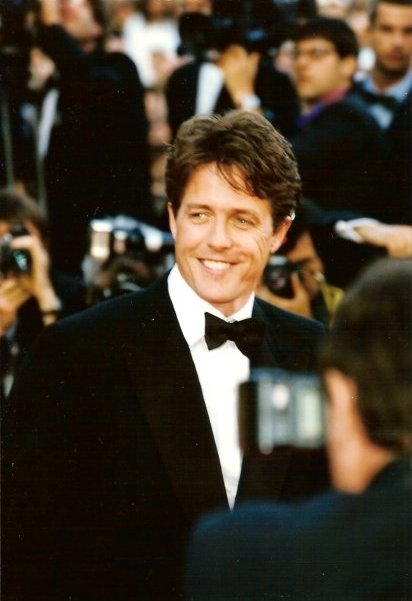
Hugh Grant at the 1997 Cannes Film Festival

Compared to the 1980s, investment in film production rose dramatically. In 1989, annual investment was a meagre £104 million. By 1996, this figure had soared to £741 million. Nevertheless, the dependence on finance from television broadcasters such as the BBC and Channel 4 meant that budgets were often low and indigenous production was very fragmented: the film industry mostly relied on Hollywood inward investment. At parliamentary committee hearing in 1994, the directors Alan Parker, Ken Loach and Mike Leigh criticised the government's lack of support to the British film industry. They also called for a levy on cinema admissions to support film production along with a quota on multiplexes to show British and European made films. According to critic Neil Watson, it was hoped that the £90 million apportioned by the new National Lottery into three franchises (The Film Consortium, Pathé Pictures, and DNA) would fill the gap, but "corporate and equity finance for the UK film production industry continues to be thin on the ground and most production companies operating in the sector remain hopelessly under-capitalised."

These problems were mostly compensated by PolyGram Filmed Entertainment, a film studio whose British subsidiary Working Title Films released a Richard Curtis-scripted comedy Four Weddings and a Funeral (1994). It grossed $244 million worldwide and introduced Hugh Grant to global fame, led to renewed interest and investment in British films, and set a pattern for British-set romantic comedies, including Sliding Doors (1998) and Notting Hill (1999). Other Working Titles films included Bean (1997), Elizabeth (1998) and Captain Corelli's Mandolin (2001). PFE was eventually sold and merged with Universal Pictures in 1999, the hopes and expectations of "building a British-based company which could compete with Hollywood in its home market [had] eventually collapsed."

Tax incentives allowed American producers to increasingly invest in UK-based film production throughout the 1990s, including films such as Interview with the Vampire (1994), Mission: Impossible (1996), Saving Private Ryan (1998), Star Wars: Episode I – The Phantom Menace (1999) and The Mummy (1999). Miramax also distributed Neil Jordan's acclaimed thriller The Crying Game (1992), which was generally ignored on its initial release in the UK, but was a considerable success in the United States. The same company also enjoyed some success releasing the BBC period drama Enchanted April (1992) and The Wings of the Dove (1997).

Among the more successful British films were the Merchant Ivory productions Howards End (1992) and The Remains of the Day (1993), Richard Attenborough's Shadowlands (1993), and Kenneth Branagh's Shakespeare adaptations. The Madness of King George (1994) proved there was still a market for British costume dramas, and other period films followed, including Sense and Sensibility (1995), Restoration (1995), Emma (1996), Mrs. Brown (1997), Basil (1998), Shakespeare in Love (1998) and Topsy-Turvy (1999).

After a six-year hiatus for legal reasons the James Bond films returned to production with the 17th Bond film, GoldenEye. With their traditional home Pinewood Studios fully booked, a new studio was created for the film in a former Rolls-Royce aero-engine factory at Leavesden in Hertfordshire.

Mike Leigh emerged as a significant figure in British cinema in the 1990s, with a series of films financed by Channel 4 about working and middle class life in modern England, including Life Is Sweet (1991), Naked (1993) and his biggest hit Secrets & Lies (1996), which won the Palme d'Or at Cannes.

Other new talents to emerge during the decade included the writer-director-producer team of John Hodge, Danny Boyle and Andrew Macdonald responsible for Shallow Grave (1994) and Trainspotting (1996). The latter film generated interested in other "regional" productions, including the Scottish films Small Faces (1996), Ratcatcher (1999) and My Name Is Joe (1998).

=== 2000s ===
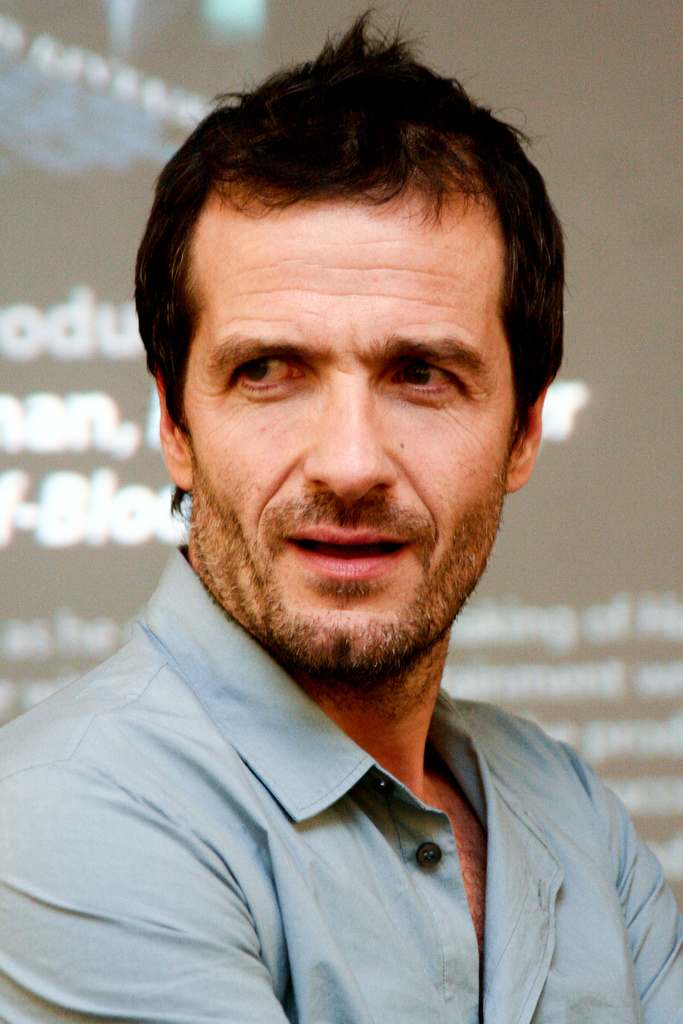
David Heyman, who produced all eight instalments of the Harry Potter film series

The first decade of the 21st century was a relatively successful one for the British film industry. Many British films found a wide international audience due to funding from BBC Films, Film 4 and the UK Film Council, and some independent production companies, such as Working Title, secured financing and distribution deals with major American studios. Working Title scored three major international successes, all starring Hugh Grant and Colin Firth, with the romantic comedies Bridget Jones's Diary (2001), which grossed $254 million worldwide; the sequel Bridget Jones: The Edge of Reason, which earned $228 million; and Richard Curtis's directorial debut Love Actually (2003), which grossed $239 million. The most successful of all, Phyllida Lloyd's Mamma Mia! (2008), grossed $601 million.

The new decade saw a major new film series in the Harry Potter films, beginning with Harry Potter and the Philosopher's Stone in 2001. David Heyman's company Heyday Films has produced seven sequels, with the final title released in two parts – Harry Potter and the Deathly Hallows – Part 1 in 2010 and Harry Potter and the Deathly Hallows – Part 2 in 2011. All were filmed at Leavesden Studios in England.

Aardman Animations' Nick Park, the creator of Wallace and Gromit and the Creature Comforts series, produced his first feature-length film, Chicken Run in 2000. Co-directed with Peter Lord, the film was a major success worldwide and one of the most successful British films of its year. Park's follow up, Wallace & Gromit: The Curse of the Were-Rabbit was another worldwide hit: it grossed $56 million at the US box office and £32 million in the UK. It also won the 2005 Academy Award for Best Animated Feature.

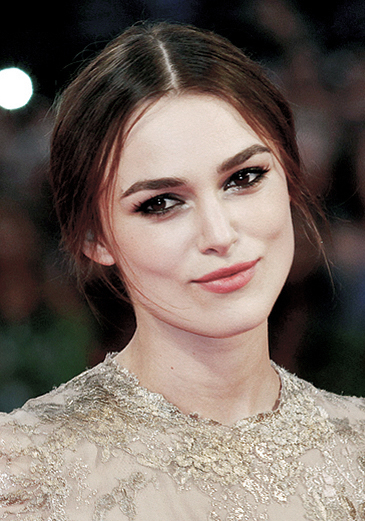
Keira Knightley at the 68th Venice International Film Festival

However it was usually through domestically funded features throughout the decade that British directors and films won awards at the top international film festivals. In 2003, Michael Winterbottom won the Golden Bear at the Berlin Film Festival for In This World. In 2004, Mike Leigh directed Vera Drake, an account of a housewife who leads a double life as an abortion provider in 1950s London. The film won the Golden Lion at the Venice Film Festival. In 2006 Stephen Frears directed The Queen based on the events surrounding the death of Princess Diana, which won the Best Actress prize at the Venice Film Festival and Academy Awards and the BAFTA for Best Film. In 2006, Ken Loach won the Palme d'Or at the Cannes Film Festival with his account of the struggle for Irish Independence in The Wind That Shakes the Barley. Joe Wright's adaptation of the Ian McEwan novel Atonement was nominated for 7 Academy Awards, including Best Film and won the Golden Globe and BAFTA for Best Film. Slumdog Millionaire was filmed entirely in Mumbai with a mostly Indian cast, though with a British director (Danny Boyle), producer (Christian Colson), screenwriter (Simon Beaufoy) and star (Dev Patel)—the film was all-British financed via Film4 and Celador. It has received worldwide critical acclaim. It has won four Golden Globes, seven BAFTA Awards and eight Academy Awards, including Best Director and Best Film. The King's Speech, which tells the story of King George VI's attempts to overcome his speech impediment, was directed by Tom Hooper and filmed almost entirely in London. It received four Academy Awards (including Best Film, Best Director, Best Actor and Best Screenplay) in 2011.

The start of the 21st century saw Asian British cinema assert itself at the box office, starting with East Is East (1999) and continuing with Bend It Like Beckham (2002). Other notable British Asian films from this period include My Son the Fanatic (1997), Ae Fond Kiss... (2004), Mischief Night (2006), Yasmin (2004) and Four Lions (2010). Some argue it has brought more flexible attitudes towards casting Black and Asian British actors, with Robbie Gee and Naomie Harris take leading roles in Underworld and 28 Days Later respectively.

2005 saw the emergence of The British Urban Film Festival, a timely addition to the film festival calendar, which recognised the influence of urban and black films on UK audiences and consequently began to showcase a growing profile of films in a genre previously not otherwise regularly seen in the capital's cinemas. Then, in 2006, Kidulthood, a film depicting a group of teenagers growing up on the streets of West London, had a limited release. This was successfully followed up with a sequel Adulthood (2008) that was written and directed by actor Noel Clarke. The success of Kidulthood and Adulthood led to the release of several other films in the 2000s and 2010s such as Bullet Boy (2004), Life and Lyrics (2006), The Intent (2016), its sequel The Intent 2: The Come Up (2018), Blue Story and Rocks (both 2019), all of starred Black-British actors.

Like the 1960s, this decade saw plenty of British films directed by imported talent. The American Woody Allen shot Match Point (2005) and three later films in London. The Mexican director Alfonso Cuarón helmed Harry Potter and the Prisoner of Azkaban (2004) and Children of Men (2006); New Zealand filmmaker Jane Campion made Bright Star (2009), a film set in 19th century London; Danish director Nicolas Winding Refn made Bronson (2008), a biopic about the English criminal Michael Gordon Peterson; the Spanish filmmaker Juan Carlos Fresnadillo directed 28 Weeks Later (2007), a sequel to a British horror film; and two John le Carré adaptations were also directed by foreigners—The Constant Gardener by the Brazilian Fernando Meirelles and Tinker Tailor Soldier Spy by the Swedish Tomas Alfredson. The decade also saw English actor Daniel Craig became the new James Bond with Casino Royale, the 21st entry in the official Eon Productions series.

Despite increasing competition from film studios in Australia and Eastern Europe, British studios such as Pinewood, Shepperton and Leavesden remained successful in hosting major productions, including Finding Neverland, Closer, Batman Begins, Charlie and the Chocolate Factory, United 93, The Phantom of the Opera, Sweeney Todd, Fantastic Mr. Fox, Robin Hood, X-Men: First Class, Hugo and War Horse.

In February 2007, the UK became home to Europe's first DCI-compliant fully digital multiplex cinemas with the launch of Odeon Hatfield and Odeon Surrey Quays (in London), with a total of 18 digital screens.

In November 2010, Warner Bros. completed the acquisition of Leavesden Film Studios, becoming the first Hollywood studio since the 1940s to have a permanent base in the UK, and announced plans to invest £100 million in the site.

A study by the British Film Institute published in December 2013 found that of the 613 tracked British films released between 2003 and 2010 only 7% made a profit. Films with low budgets, those that cost below £500,000 to produce, were even less likely to gain a return on outlay. Of these films, only 3.1% went into the black. At the top end of budgets for the British industry, under a fifth of films that cost £10million went into profit.

=== 2010s ===
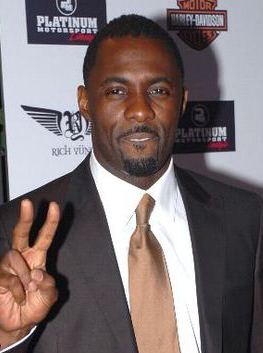
Idris Elba in 2007. He is one of the top 20 highest-grossing actors in North America, as of 2019.

On 26 July 2010 it was announced that the UK Film Council, which was the main body responsible for the development of promotion of British cinema during the 2000s, would be abolished, with many of the abolished body's functions being taken over by the British Film Institute. Actors and professionals, including James McAvoy, Emily Blunt, Pete Postlethwaite, Damian Lewis, Timothy Spall, Daniel Barber and Ian Holm, campaigned against the council's abolition. The move also led American actor and director Clint Eastwood (who had filmed Hereafter in London) to write to the British Chancellor of the Exchequer George Osborne in August 2010 to protest the decision to close the council. Eastwood warned Osborne that the closure could result in fewer foreign production companies choosing to work in the UK. A grass-roots online campaign was launched and a petition established by supporters of the council.

Countering this, a few professionals, including Michael Winner and Julian Fellowes, supported the Government's decision. A number of other organisations responded positively.

At the closure of the UK Film Council on 31 March 2011, The Guardian reported that "The UKFC's entire annual budget was a reported £3m, while the cost of closing it down and restructuring is estimated to have been almost four times that amount." One of the UKFC's last films, The King's Speech, is estimated to have cost $15m to make and grossed $235m, besides winning several Academy Awards. UKFC invested $1.6m for a 34% share of net profits, a valuable stake that will pass to the British Film Institute.

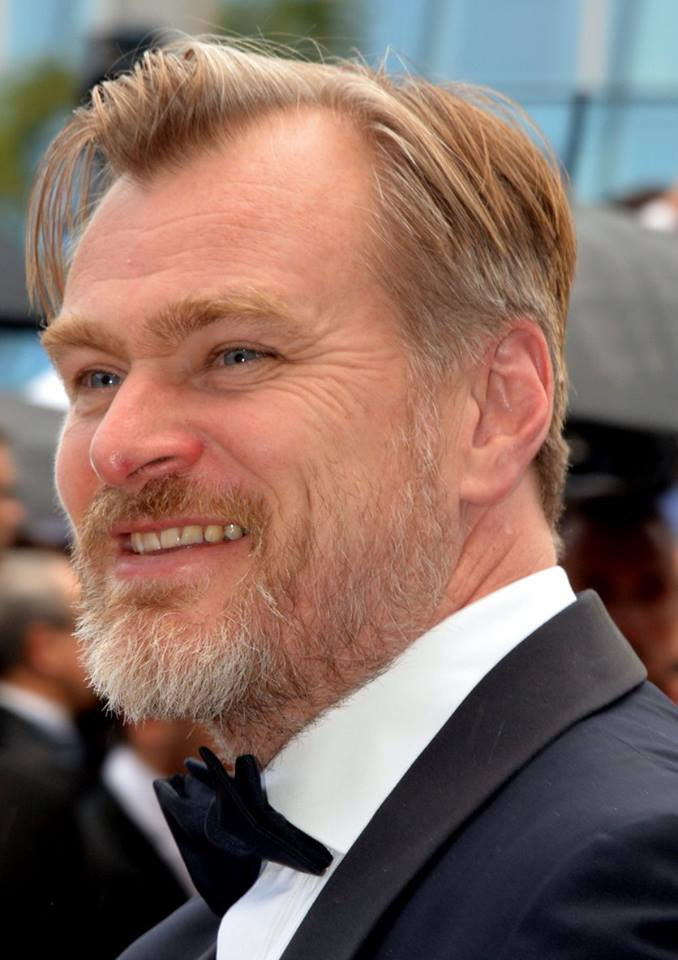
Christopher Nolan directed several of the early 21st century's most critically and commercially successful films.

In June 2012, Warner opened the re-developed Leavesden studio for business. The most commercially successful British directors in recent years are Paul Greengrass, Mike Newell, Christopher Nolan, Ridley Scott and David Yates.

In January 2012, at Pinewood Studios to visit film-related businesses, UK Prime Minister David Cameron said that his government had bold ambitions for the film industry: "Our role, and that of the BFI, should be to support the sector in becoming even more dynamic and entrepreneurial, helping UK producers to make commercially successful pictures that rival the quality and impact of the best international productions. Just as the British Film Commission has played a crucial role in attracting the biggest and best international studios to produce their films here, so we must incentivise UK producers to chase new markets both here and overseas."

The film industry remains an important earner for the British economy. According to a UK Film Council press release of 20 January 2011, £1.115 billion was spent on UK film production during 2010. A 2014 survey suggested that British-made films were generally more highly rated than Hollywood productions, especially when considering low-budget UK productions.

=== 2020s ===
In November 2022, director Danny Boyle expressed a negative sentiment of the British film industry in recent years, stating that "I am not sure we are great filmmakers, to be absolutely honest. As a nation, our two artforms are theatre, in a middle-class sense, and pop music, because we are extraordinary at it."

The BFI's published figures reported £6.27 billion spent on film and high-end television production in 2022, with domestic UK film spend at £173.6 million. While the total spend was at a record high for the UK, the independent UK filmmaking spend decreased by 31% since 2021.

The UK film industry was affected by the 2023 SAG-AFTRA strike with 80% of behind-the-scenes workers surveyed stating that their jobs had been affected.

== Art cinema ==
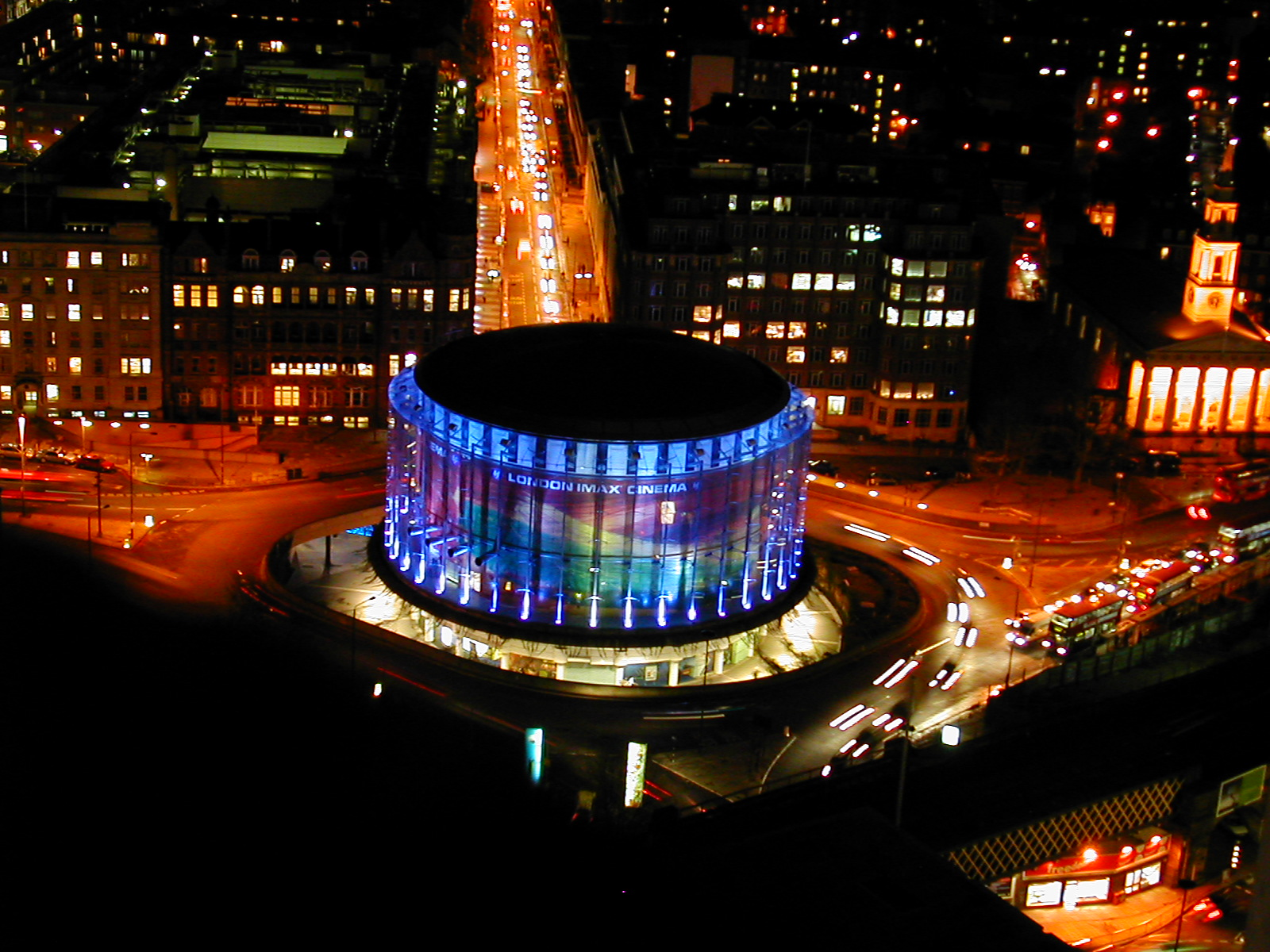
BFI IMAX cinema

Although it had been funding British experimental films as early as 1952, the British Film Institute's foundation of a production board in 1964—and a substantial increase in public funding from 1971 onwards—enabled it to become a dominant force in developing British art cinema in the 1970s and 80s: from the first of Bill Douglas's Trilogy My Childhood (1972), and of Terence Davies' Trilogy Childhood (1978), via Peter Greenaway's earliest films (including the surprising commercial success of The Draughtsman's Contract (1982)) and Derek Jarman's championing of the New Queer Cinema. The first full-length feature produced under the BFI's new scheme was Kevin Brownlow and Andrew Mollo's Winstanley (1975), while others included Moon Over the Alley (1975), Requiem for a Village (1975), the openly avant-garde Central Bazaar (1973), Pressure (1975) and A Private Enterprise (1974) – the last two being, respectively, the first British Black and Asian features.

The release of Derek Jarman's Jubilee (1978) marked the beginning of a successful period of UK art cinema, continuing into the 1980s with filmmakers like Sally Potter and Ken McMullen, and producers like Stewart Richards, with success at the Cannes Film Festival and the Academy Awards. Unlike the previous generation of British film makers who had broken into directing and production after careers in the theatre or on television, the Art Cinema Directors were mostly the products of Art Schools. Many of these filmmakers were championed in their early career by the London Film Makers Cooperative and their work was the subject of detailed theoretical analysis in the journal Screen Education. Peter Greenaway was an early pioneer of the use of computer generated imagery blended with filmed footage and was also one of the first directors to film entirely on high definition video for a cinema release.

With the launch of Channel 4 and its Film on Four commissioning strand, Art Cinema was promoted to a wider audience. However, the Channel had a sharp change in its commissioning policy in the early 1990s and Greenaway and others were forced to seek European co-production financing.

== Film technology ==
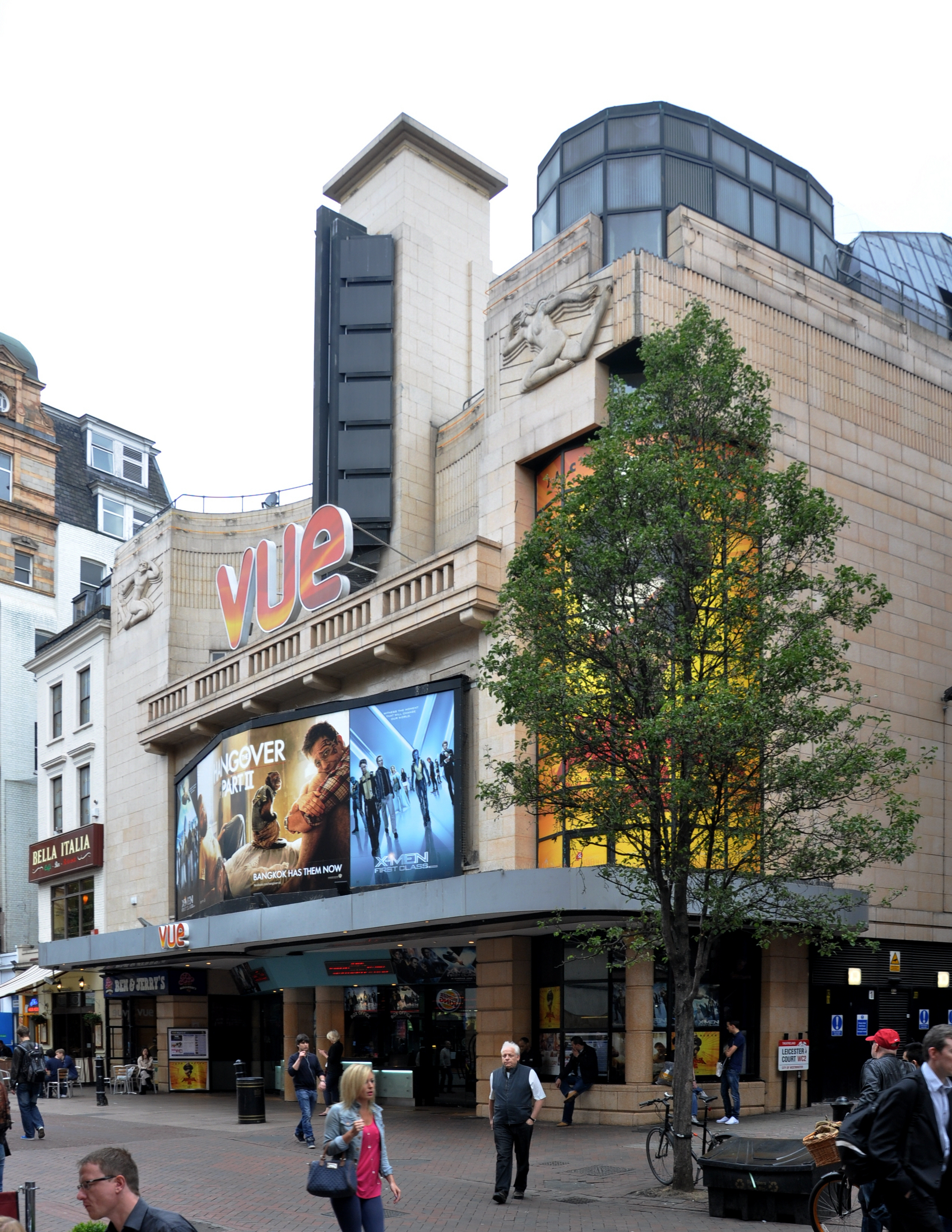
Vue cinema, Leicester Square

In the 1970s and 1980s, British studios established a reputation for great special effects in films such as Superman (1978), Alien (1979), and Batman (1989). Some of this reputation was founded on the core of talent brought together for the filming of 2001: A Space Odyssey (1968) who subsequently worked together on series and feature films for Gerry Anderson. Thanks to the Bristol-based Aardman Animations, the UK is still recognised as a world leader in the use of stop-motion animation.

British special effects technicians and production designers are known for creating visual effects at a far lower cost than their counterparts in the US, as seen in Time Bandits (1981) and Brazil (1985). This reputation has continued through the 1990s and into the 21st century with films such as the James Bond series, Gladiator (2000) and the Harry Potter franchise.

From the 1990s onward, film production has increasingly shifted from traditional optical processes to digital workflows, in which visual effects, editing, colour grading, and other post-production tasks are carried out using digital technology. The London-based visual effects company Framestore, with visual effects supervisor Tim Webber, has worked on a number of technically demanding productions, including, The Dark Knight (2008) and Gravity (2013), For Gravity, Webber and the Framestore team developed new visual effects techniques, with the production of the film's visual effects taking approximately three years.

The availability of high-speed internet has made the British film industry capable of working closely with U.S. studios as part of globally distributed productions. As of 2005, this trend is expected to continue with moves towards (currently experimental) digital distribution and projection as mainstream technologies. The British film This Is Not a Love Song (2003) was the first to be streamed live on the Internet at the same time as its cinema premiere.

== Film festivals ==
The United Kingdom is home to a variety of film festivals celebrating both national and international cinema. Major annual events include the BFI London Film Festival, the country's largest public film event, the Glasgow Film Festival, and Sheffield DocFest, one of the world's leading documentary festivals.

These festivals provide a platform for independent, documentary, and international filmmakers, as well as showcasing emerging British talent. In recent years, specialist festivals focusing on horror, LGBTQ+, and short films have also gained prominence in cities such as Manchester, Brighton, and Bristol.

== Black British cinema ==
Black British cinema has experienced significant growth in recent years, with directors like Steve McQueen (Small Axe), Dionne Edwards (Pretty Red Dress), and Rapman (Blue Story) addressing cultural, social, and racial issues within the UK.

== See also ==
Awards

- British Academy Film Awards
- Grierson Awards
- Sutherland Trophy

Festivals

- BFI London Film Festival

Institutions/Organizations

- British Academy of Film and Television Arts
- British Film Institute
- London Film School
- National Film and Television School

Lists

- List of Academy Award winners and nominees from Great Britain
- List of British actors
- List of British film directors
- List of British film studios
- List of highest-grossing films in the United Kingdom
- Lists of British films

Movements/Subgenres

- British New Wave
- Heritage film
- Kitchen sink realism

Cinema by Country

- Cinema of Northern Ireland
- Cinema of Scotland
- Cinema of Wales
