= An Over-Incubated Baby =

- Directed by: Walter R. Booth
- Produced by: Robert W. Paul
- Production company: Paul's Animatograph Works
- Release date: 1901
- Running time: 1 minute 5 secs
- Country: United Kingdom
- Language: Silent

An Over-Incubated Baby (AKA: The Wonderful Baby Incubator) is a 1901 British silent comic trick film, directed by Walter R. Booth, featuring a woman who gets an unpleasant surprise after placing her baby in Professor Bakem's baby incubator for 12 months growth in one hour. The film is, "one of the most original of the trick films made by W.R. Booth and R.W. Paul in 1901." According to Michael Brooke of BFI Screenonline, "one of the less elaborate films made by Booth and Paul that year, though the concept itself is so imaginative that it arguably didn't need any more than basic jump-cut transformations."

== See also ==
- 1901 in science fiction
