= Cheese Mites, or Lilliputians in a London Restaurant =

1901 British film by Walter R. Booth

- Directed by: Walter R. Booth
- Produced by: Robert W. Paul
- Production company: Paul's Animatograph Works
- Release date: August 1901
- Running time: 56 secs
- Country: United Kingdom
- Language: Silent

Cheese Mites, or Lilliputians in a London Restaurant is a 1901 British short silent trick film, directed by Walter R. Booth. A gentleman is entertained by the little people who emerge from the cheese at his table.

== Reception ==
Michael Brooke of BFI Screenonline wrote that Booth "combined the jump-cut with superimposition, so that the miniature people (shot on an exaggeratedly large table-top set) appear on screen alongside the normal-sized diner. Thankfully, he seems to find the sight more amusing than alarming."

== Release ==
This film is included in the BFI DVD compilation R.W. Paul: The Collected Films 1895–1908.
