= The Waif and the Wizard =

- Directed by: Walter R. Booth
- Produced by: Robert W. Paul
- Production company: Paul's Animatograph Works
- Release date: September 1901
- Running time: 1 minute 15 secs
- Country: United Kingdom
- Language: Silent

The Waif and the Wizard, also entitled The Home Made Happy, is a 1901 British silent comic trick film, directed by Walter R. Booth, featuring a magician using his magic to aid an ailing girl at the request of her brother. The film, "is rather less elaborate in terms of special effects than the other films that W.R. Booth and R.W. Paul made the same year," but, according to Michael Brooke of BFI Screenonline, "provides an excellent illustration of how effects used sparingly can often have more impact, especially when set in a suitable emotional context."
