= Artistic Creation =

1901 British silent film by Walter R. Booth

- Directed by: Walter R. Booth
- Produced by: Robert W. Paul
- Production company: Paul's Animatograph Works
- Release date: 1901
- Running time: 1 min 15 secs
- Country: United Kingdom
- Language: Silent

Artistic Creation is a 1901 British silent comic trick film directed by Walter R. Booth, featuring a lightning sketch artist drawing a picture of a woman which comes to life piece by piece. The film "is one of the earliest examples of a film about an artist's creations coming to life," and according to Michael Brooke of BFI Screenonline, "a metaphorical cautionary tale about the responsibilities that should be borne by both creative artists and indeed the male sex in general."
