= Walter R. Booth =

British magician and early pioneer of British film (1869-1938)

- Photograph of Walter R Booth published in 1898 (Davenport Collection)
- Born: 12 July 1869; Worcester, England
- Died: 8 May 1938 (aged 68); Birmingham, England
- Occupation: Filmmaker

Walter Robert Booth (12 July 1869 – 8 May 1938) was a British magician and early pioneer of British film. Collaborating with Robert W. Paul and then Charles Urban mostly on "trick" films, he pioneered techniques that led to what has been described as the first British animated film, The Hand of the Artist (1906). Booth is also notable for making the earliest film adaptation of A Christmas Carol with the silent film Scrooge, or, Marley's Ghost (1901).

== Biography ==
Booth was born in July 1869, the son of a porcelain painter. He followed his father with an apprenticeship at the Royal Worcester porcelain factory in 1882, where he worked until 1890. He had been a keen amateur magician and subsequently he joined the magic company of John Nevil Maskelyne and David Devant at the Egyptian Hall in Piccadilly, London, where he is presumed to have first encountered filmmaker Robert W. Paul, who exhibited some of his earliest films there in 1896.

Advertising flyer for Walter R Booth - Entertainer (Davenport Collection)

Booth went to work for Paul first devising and then later directing short trick films, beginning with The Miser's Doom and Upside Down; or, the Human Flies (both 1899). Many of their early collaborations, such as Hindoo Jugglers and Chinese Magic (both 1900) were based on conjuring tricks, whilst A Railway Collision (1900) pioneered the use of scale models. They reached the height of their collaboration in 1901; with simple trick films, such as Undressing Extraordinary, The Waif and the Wizard and An Over-Incubated Baby which relied on jump-cuts, The Devil in the Studio and Artistic Creation which integrated hand drawn elements, and Cheese Mites; or, Lilliputians in a London Restaurant which experimented with superimposition; as well as more complex films, such as The Haunted Curiosity Shop, Scrooge, or, Marley's Ghost and The Magic Sword which has been compared to the work of Georges Méliès. Their collaborations continued for the next five years with such films as The Extraordinary Waiter (1902), An Extraordinary Cab Accident and The Voyage of the Arctic (both 1903), before culminating with Is Spiritualism A Fraud? and The '?' Motorist (both 1906).

In 1906, Booth went to work for Charles Urban and constructed his own outdoor studio in the back garden of Neville Lodge, Woodlands, Isleworth, London, where, with F. Harold Bastick, he made The Hand of the Artist (1906), which has been described as the first British animated film. He went on to produce at least 15 films a year for Urban until 1915, including semi-animated trick films The Sorcerer's Scissors (1907), When the Devil Drives (1907), and proto-science fiction invasion fantasies The Airship Destroyer (1909) and The Aerial Submarine (1910), as well as The Automatic Motorist (1911), a partial remake of The '?' Motorist (1906).

He subsequently went on to produce advertising films, including A Cure for Cross Words for Cadbury's cocoa and chocolate and he invented an advertising method called Flashing Film Ads, described as unique colour effects in light and movement. He died in Birmingham in 1938.

== Filmography ==
=== For Robert W. Paul ===
- The Miser's Doom (1899)
- Upside Down; or, the Human Flies (1899)
- The Last Days of Pompeii (1900, short, first cinematographic adaptation of Edward Bulwer-Lytton's novel of the same name)
- Chinese Magic (1900)
- Hindoo Jugglers (1900)
- A Railway Collision (1900)
- Artistic Creation (1901)
- Cheese Mites; or, Lilliputians in a London Restaurant (1901)
- The Devil in the Studio (1901)
- The Haunted Curiosity Shop (1901)
- The Magic Sword (1901)
- An Over-Incubated Baby (1901)
- Scrooge, or, Marley's Ghost (1901)
- Undressing Extraordinary (1901)
- The Waif and the Wizard (1901)
- The Extraordinary Waiter (1902)
- An Extraordinary Cab Accident (1903)
- Political Favourites (1903)
- The Voyage of the Arctic (1903)
- The '?' Motorist (1906)
- Is Spiritualism a Fraud? (1906)

=== For Charles Urban ===
- The Hand of the Artist (1906)
- The Sorcerer's Scissors (1907)
- When the Devil Drives (1907)
- Willie's Magic Wand (1907)
- The Airship Destroyer (1909)
- The Aerial Submarine (1910)
- Aerial Anarchists (1911)
- The Automatic Motorist (1911)
- Santa Claus (1912)
