= 1901 in film =

The year 1901 in film involved some significant events.

== Events ==
- Edwin S. Porter is put in charge of Thomas Edison's motion-picture production company
- Thomas Edison closes "America's First Movie Studio", the Edison's Black Maria

== Notable films ==
=== A ===
- Alfred Butterworth and Sons, Glebe Mills, Hollinwood, produced by Mitchell and Kenyon – (UK)
- Another Job for the Undertaker, directed by Edwin S. Porter and George S. Fleming – (US)

=== B ===
PLAY: The Big Swallow (1 minute)

- The Big Swallow, directed by James Williamson – (UK)
- Blue Beard (Barbe-Bleue), directed by Georges Méliès, based on the 1697 fairy tale by Charles Perrault – (France)

=== C ===
- The Countryman and the Cinematograph, directed by Robert W. Paul – (UK)
- Cunard Vessel at Liverpool, produced by Mitchell and Kenyon – (UK)

=== D ===
- The Devil and the Statue (Le Diable géant ou le Miracle de la Madone), directed by Georges Méliès – (France)
- Dream and Reality (Rêve et réalité), directed by Ferdinand Zecca – (France)

=== E ===
- Employees Leaving Alexandra Docks, Liverpool, produced by Mitchell and Kenyon – (UK)
- Excelsior!, directed by Georges Méliès – (France)

=== F ===
- Fire!, directed by James Williamson – (UK)

=== G ===
- The Gans-McGovern Fight, a documentary starring Joe Gans and Terry McGovern – (US)
- The Gordon Sisters Boxing, directed by Thomas Edison – (US)

=== H ===
- The Haunted Curiosity Shop, directed by Walter R. Booth – (UK)
- History of a Crime (Histoire d'un crime), directed by Ferdinand Zecca – (France)

=== I ===
- Inauguration of the Australian Commonwealth, documentary directed by Joseph Perry – (Australia)

=== J ===
- Jamaica Street, Glasgow, produced by Mitchell and Kenyon – (UK)

=== K ===
- Kansas Saloon Smashers, directed by Edwin S. Porter – (US)

=== L ===
- Lord Roberts' Visit to Manchester, produced by Mitchell and Kenyon – (UK)

=== M ===
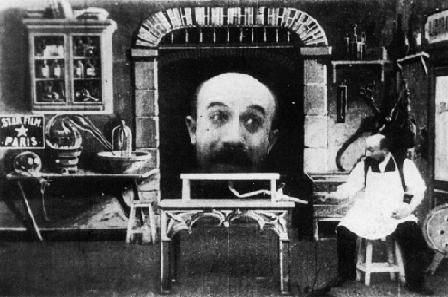
The Man with the Rubber Head.

- The Magic Sword, directed by Walter R. Booth – (UK)
- The Man with the Rubber Head (L'Homme à la tête en caoutchouc), directed by Georges Méliès – (France)
- Manchester Band of Hope Procession, produced by Mitchell and Kenyon – (UK)
- Manchester Street Scene, produced by Mitchell and Kenyon – (UK)
- Miners Leaving Pendlebury Colliery, produced by Mitchell and Kenyon – (UK)
- Morecambe Church Lads' Brigade at Drill, produced by Mitchell and Kenyon – (UK)

=== N ===
- North Sea Fisheries, North Shields, produced by Mitchell and Kenyon – (UK)

=== P ===
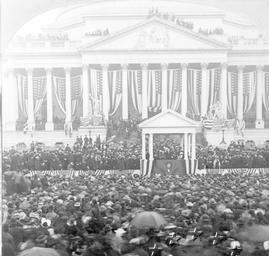
President McKinley Inauguration Footage.

- Panoramic View of the Morecambe Sea Front, produced by Mitchell and Kenyon – (UK)
- Parkgate Iron and Steel Co., Rotherham, produced by Mitchell and Kenyon – (UK)
- Peeping Tom (Par le trou de la serrure), directed by Ferdinand Zecca – (France)
- Pendlebury Spinning Co., produced by Mitchell and Kenyon – (UK)
- President McKinley Inauguration Footage, directed by Thomas Edison – (US)
- Preston Egg Rolling, produced by Mitchell and Kenyon – (UK)

=== R ===
- Race for the Muriatti Cup, Manchester, produced by Mitchell and Kenyon – (UK)
- Red Riding Hood (Le Petit Chaperon rouge) (lost), directed by Georges Méliès, based on the 17th-century fairy tale by Charles Perrault – (France)
- Ride on the Tramcar Through Belfast, produced by Mitchell and Kenyon – (UK)
- Royal Proclamation of the Death of Queen Victoria, Blackburn, produced by Mitchell and Kenyon – (UK)

=== S ===
PLAY: Scrooge or Marley's Ghost (5 minutes)

- Scrooge, or, Marley's Ghost, directed by Walter R. Booth, based on the 1843 novella A Christmas Carol by Charles Dickens – (UK)
- Sedgwick's Bioscope Show Front, produced by Mitchell and Kenyon – (UK)
- The Seven Castles of the Devil (Le Sept Châteaux du Diable), directed by Ferdinand Zecca – (France)
- A Sneaky Boer, produced by Mitchell and Kenyon – (UK)
- Star Theatre, directed by Frederick S. Armitage – (US)
- Stop Thief!, directed by James Williamson – (GB)

=== T ===
- Torpedo Flotilla Visit to Manchester, produced by Mitchell and Kenyon – (UK)
- Trapeze Disrobing Act, directed by Edwin S. Porter – (US)

=== U ===
- Undressing Extraordinary, directed by Walter R. Booth – (UK)
- University Procession on Degree Day, Birmingham, produced by Mitchell and Kenyon – (UK)

=== W ===
- What Happened on Twenty-third Street, New York City, directed by George S. Fleming and Edwin S. Porter – (US)

== Births ==
Month	Date	Name	Country	Profession	Died
January	9	Vilma Bánky	Hungary	Actress	1991
January	14	Bebe Daniels	US	Actress, singer, dancer, producer	1971
January	25	Mildred Dunnock	US	Actress	1991
February	1	Clark Gable	US	Actor	1960
February	6	Ben Lyon	US	Actor, Studio Executive	1979
February	9	Brian Donlevy	US	Actor	1972
February	10	Stella Adler	US	Actress, Acting Teacher	1992
February	16	Chester Morris	US	Actor	1970
February	22	Ken G. Hall	Australia	Producer, director	1994
February	22	Mildred Davis	US	Actress	1969
February	25	Zeppo Marx	US	Actor, comedian	1979
February	28	Sylvia Field	US	Actress	1998
March	13	Paul Fix	US	Actor	1983
March	25	Ed Begley	US	Actor	1970
March	27	Carl Barks	US	Cartoonist	2000
April	1	Edna Tichenor	US	Actress	1965
April	1	Gay Seabrook	US	Actress	1970
April	5	Melvyn Douglas	US	Actor	1981
April	30	David Manners	Canada	Actor	1998
April	May	7	Gary Cooper	US	Actor	1961
21	May	Sam Jaffe	US	Agent, Producer, Studio Executive	2000
June	3	Maurice Evans	UK	Actor	1989
June	6	Véra Korène	Russia	Actress, singer	1996
June	18	Llewellyn Rees	UK	Actor	1994
June	22	Naunton Wayne	UK	Actor	1970
June	29	Nelson Eddy	US	Actor, singer	1967
June	29	Frieda Inescort	Scotland	Actress	1976
July	7	Vittorio De Sica	Italy	Director, actor	1974
July	14	George Tobias	US	Actor	1980
July	20	Dilys Powell	UK	Critic	1995
July	21	Allyn Joslyn	US	Actor	1981
July	24	Mabel Albertson	US	Actress	1982
July	28	Rudy Vallée	US	Singer, Musician, Actor	1986
August	4	Louis Armstrong	US	Musician, Singer, Actor	1971
August	27	Roger Pryor	US	Actor	1974
September	5	Florence Eldridge	US	Actress	1988
September	12	Ben Blue	Canada	Actor, comedian	1975
September	25	Robert Bresson	France	Director	1999
September	26	Donald Cook	US	Actor	1961
September	26	George Raft	US	Actor, dancer	1980
October	2	Rita La Roy	US	Actress, dancer	1993
October	17	Cesare Bettarini	Italy	Actor	1975
November	2	James Dunn	US	Actor	1967
November	17	Lee Strasberg	Poland	Actor, director, Acting Teacher	1982
November	22	Lee Patrick	US	Actress	1982
November	29	Mildred Harris	US	Actress	1944
December	5	Walt Disney	US	Animator, Producer	1966
December	7	Troy Sanders	US	Composer, Musician	1959
December	9	Carol Dempster	US	Actress	1991
December	27	Marlene Dietrich	Germany	Actress, singer	1992

== Deaths ==
- May 9 - Charles Chaplin, Sr. (born 1863), actor and father of Charlie Chaplin.
- June 2 – James A. Herne (born 1839), actor playwright. Some of his works such as Shore Acres adapted into silent films. also father of screenwriter Julie Herne and actress Chrystal Herne.

== Debut ==
- Anna Held
