= Robbery (1897 film) =

1897 film by Robert W. Paul

- Screenshot from the film
- Directed by: Robert W. Paul
- Produced by: Robert W. Paul
- Cinematography: Robert W. Paul
- Production company: Paul's Animatograph Works
- Release date: September 1897
- Running time: 24 seconds
- Country: United Kingdom
- Language: Silent

Robbery (a.k.a. A Wayfarer Compelled to Disrobe Partially) is an 1897 British short black-and-white silent comedy film directed by Robert W. Paul, featuring a wayfairer who is forced to hand over his valuables and some of his clothes to an armed robber. The film, "although only intended as a comedy," according to Michael Brooks of BFI Screenonline, "in fact reveals how the stripping of one's Victorian 'uniform' also meant the stripping of one's integrity," and, "turns the viewer into an accomplice, since it forces us to watch the man's humiliation head-on, ultimately aligning ourselves not with the victim but with the thief." It is included on the BFI DVD R.W. Paul: The Collected Films 1895-1908.
