= The Automatic Motorist =

1911 British film by Walter R. Booth

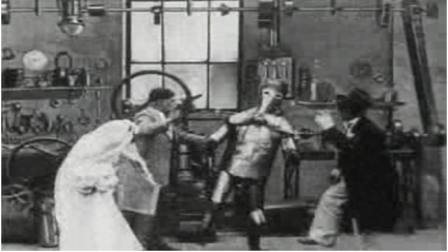
- Screenshot from the film
- Directed by: Walter R. Booth
- Production company: Kineto Films
- Release date: 1911
- Running time: 10 mins
- Country: United Kingdom
- Language: Silent

The Automatic Motorist is a 1911 British silent comic trick film, directed by Walter R. Booth, featuring a robot chauffeur taking an inventor and a young honeymooning couple on a wild ride around the planets and under the sea. The trick film is a "virtual remake of The '?' Motorist (1906)," according to Michael Brooke of BFI Screenonline, "but on a bigger scale."
