= An Extraordinary Cab Accident =

- Screenshot from the film
- Directed by: Walter R. Booth
- Produced by: Robert W. Paul
- Production company: Paul's Animatograph Works
- Release date: November 1903
- Running time: 42 seconds
- Country: United Kingdom
- Language: Silent

An Extraordinary Cab Accident is a 1903 British silent comic trick film, directed by Walter R. Booth, featuring a gentleman making a miraculous recovery after being trampled underfoot by a horse and cab. The film, "seems something of a step back," "compared with the elaborate special effects fantasies that director W.R. Booth and producer R.W. Paul had already concocted," but according to Michael Brooke of BFI Screenonline, "more complex special effects might well have worked against the impression Booth and Paul were clearly seeking to create, which is that of a man being genuinely run over by a horse-drawn cab, his body being knocked down and trampled by the horse's hooves."
