= The Miser's Doom =

- Directed by: Walter R. Booth
- Release date: 1899
- Country: United Kingdom

The Miser's Doom is an 1899 British short film directed by Walter R. Booth. The film seems to be a lost film.

== Plot ==
A miser is haunted by the ghost of one of his deceased victims, causing him to die of shock.

== Production ==
The Miser's Doom was the directing debut of Walter R. Booth, a magician who had begun working with filmmaker R. W. Paul.

== Legacy ==
The Miser's Doom is one of the earliest films featuring a ghost, although previous examples had been produced by Georges Méliès and George Albert Smith the previous year.

== See also ==
- List of ghost films
