= The Magic Sword (1901 film) =

- Directed by: Walter R. Booth
- Produced by: Robert W. Paul
- Production company: Paul's Animatograph Works
- Release date: 1901
- Running time: 2 mins 50 secs
- Country: United Kingdom
- Language: Silent

The Magic Sword; or, A Medieval Mystery (AKA: Magical Sword) is a 1901 British silent fantasy trick film, directed by Walter R. Booth, featuring a mediaeval knight battling to save a damsel from an ogre and a witch. The film, "is impressively elaborate, with single shots containing multiple trick effects achieved through complex double exposures and superimpositions," and according to Michael Brooke of BFI Screenonline, "was so startling that it moved the legendary stage illusionist J.N. Maskelyne (of Maskelyne and Devant fame) to describe The Magic Sword as the finest trick film made up to then."

== Plot ==
On the roof of an old palace appear a young knight and his lady. While they are dancing happily, a witch who wants to capture the lady shows up. The knight release her to fight against the witch and defend her, and when he is about to stop the witch, she sits on her broom and escapes flying towards the Moon. Her disappearance, causes several Hobgoblins to harass the couple and one of them manages to take the lady with him and the knight can do nothing to stop him from doing it. Afterwards, he feels pain for his loss, but suddenly a fairy appears to him, who displays a magic sword and tells him that he can use it to rescue his lady.

== Author's comments ==
Robert W. Paul was proudly satisfied with this film, since it has three separate scenes, something very unusual for 1901. And also, it is a film that is full of special effects, including the impressive moment in which a giant ogre appears suddenly on the merlons of a castle.

Paul stated that "the use of Anglo-Saxon figures and costumes can not fail to please English-speaking audiences, who have grown weary of foreign images of this kind." Regardless of whether there is any contemporary evidence of this, it seems likely that Paul has been referring to the popularity of fantasies based on the tricks of Georges Méliès.

== Special effects ==
Being a film that lasts two minutes, its plot is simplistic. And the backdrops and the settings of the film are not very detailed as they were in other films of that time, especially those of Méliès, but the simplicity of the opening scene in particular, helps to focus the attention on the action.

Leaving the simplicity of these factors aside, the part for which it stands out the most is its visual image, which is both familiar and strange. The film incorporates many cinematographic tricks during the two minutes of duration. And although they had already been explored in other films individually years before, what is special is that all the tricks that were known until then were used collectively for this film. Some of these tricks include:

- A fade out dissolving between shots, when the knight happens to be on the roof of the castle to be in a kind of cave.
- The stop trick or jump cut to make the fairy appear or disappear out of nowhere.
- The overlays to place two scenes of different distances with different camera approaches in the same shot, as is the case of the head of the evil ogre. The inventor of this trick seems to be a controversial subject, because Méliès, Robert W. Paul and Walter R. Booth introduced it at the end of 1901, each independently. Paul and Booth did it with this film and Méliès did it with The Man with the Rubber Head (L'homme à la tête en caoutchouc), but it is impossible to determine who was the first to introduce it before.
- Double exposure to create a ghostly apparition, as when phantasmagorical figures appear to the knight and distract him.
- Fireworks explosions towards the end of a scene combined with a fade out, as when the knight manages to make the witch disappear with his magic sword.

With these special effects, the film managed to surprise and make enjoy the experience to a public of 1901, thanks to the great concentration of tricks, the fast pace of the actions or the aesthetics itself. It is a film that was not innovative in technical matters, but knew how to intelligently apply the innovations that had existed until then in a primary scenario to explain a story, instead of showing mastery of visual tricks, giving more importance to the story than to the special effects.

== Relationship with Georges Méliès ==
This film was made by two pioneers of British cinema. Walter R. Booth as director and Robert W. Paul as producer. Both had already worked together before with the short movie of A Railway Collision in 1900. In this film, you can already see a great work in the set and the desire to experiment with tricks inspired by Georges Méliès.

On the one hand, Robert W. Paul was an inventor, who entered the film industry as an experimenter and director. However, he left it to become a producer of other visionaries like him.

On the other hand, Walter R. Booth was intrigued by the possibilities offered of making a film. His work may resemble of Méliès because they share a similar background and antecedents. But, it is in this movie of The Magic Sword that the relationship between the two is more obvious and clear, where they took advantage of the incredible popularity of Méliès style, to become one of the best representations of the fantasy film genre from the beginnings of the history of cinema

We see many points in common between this film and the figure of Méliès such as:

- The predilection for the genre of fantasy or fairy tales.
- Tricks used in the film to create visual effects, such as double exposures or overlaying.
- Painted backdrops to make overlaying in it afterwards.
