= Upside Down; or, the Human Flies =

- Directed by: Walter R. Booth
- Produced by: Robert W. Paul
- Production company: Paul's Animatograph Works
- Release date: September 1899
- Running time: 1 minute
- Country: United Kingdom
- Language: Silent

Upside Down; or, the Human Flies is an 1899 British silent trick film, directed by Walter R. Booth, featuring a conjuror sending his audience to the ceiling. The film, "exploits a very simple illusion: that of filming with the camera turned upside-down so that the actors appear to be performing on the ceiling," and according to Michael Brooke of BFI Screenonline, "the effectiveness of the final result is such that nearly seventy years later Stanley Kubrick used the same technique in 2001: A Space Odyssey (1968)." The conjuror was reputedly played by Booth himself.
