= Children in the Nursery =

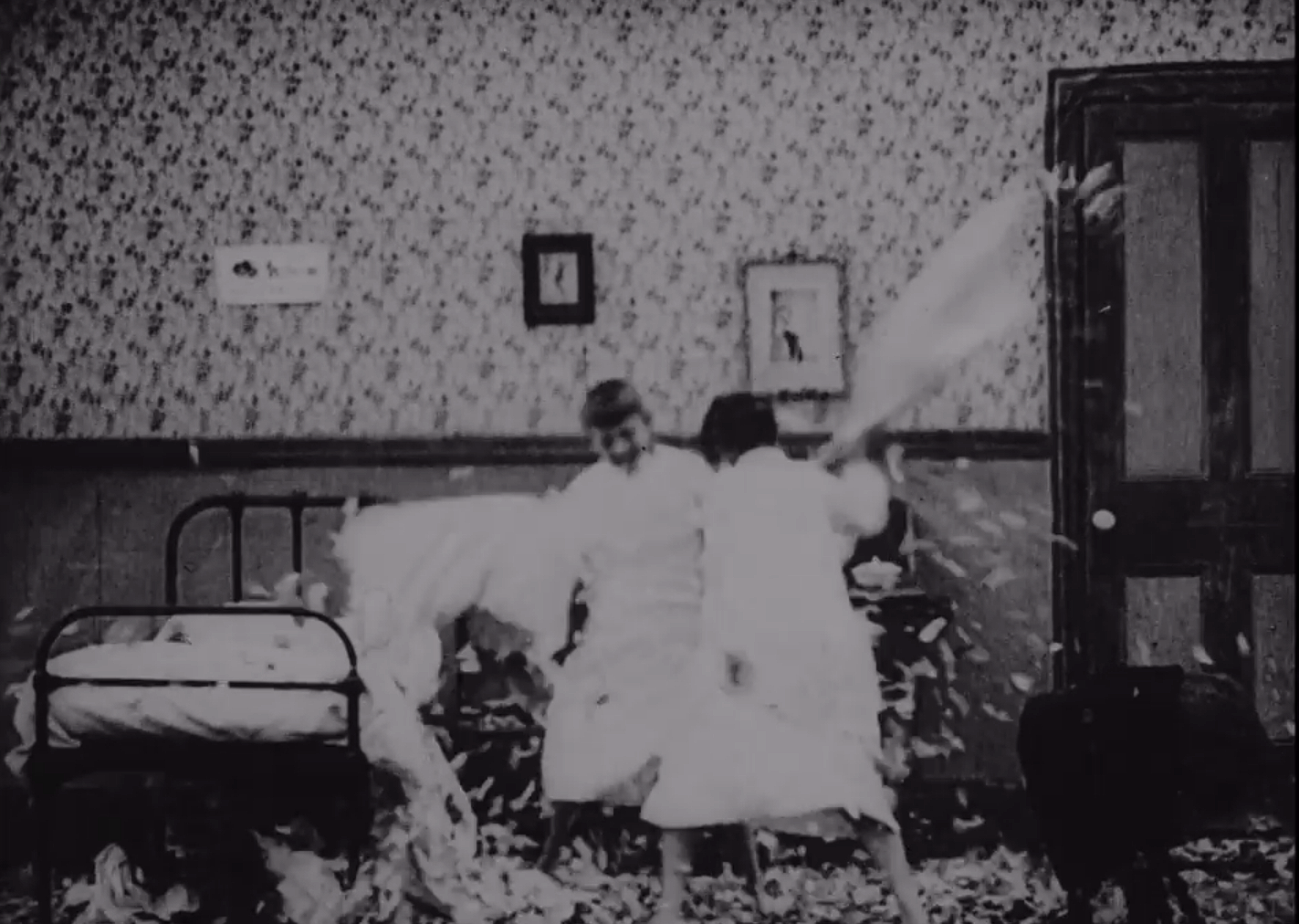
- Directed by: R.W. Paul
- Release date: 1898
- Running time: 1 minute and 7 seconds
- Country: United Kingdom
- Language: silent

Children in the Nursery is a black and white silent comedy short film filmed in 1898 and directed by R.W. Paul, showing three children getting up to mischief in a Victorian style home.

== Synopsis ==
The film is around a minute long. It shows a mother tucking her two sons into bed, when suddenly their sister runs into the bedroom and tickles their faces. When they wake up, she hides under the bed. Both boys think it was each other and start a pillow fight ripping the pillows apart. The mother then comes in and disciplines the boys and finds the girl hiding under the bed.

== Impact ==
The film has been cited as an example of how to construct a film with a single fixed camera to illustrate a story, and also as an early "more sophisticated" use of children to increase popularity. Film historian Luke McKernan stated that Children in the Nursery summed up "the nature of the British film industry" at that time, in particular how underdeveloped it was, but that it also suggested the uniqueness of the British genre.
