= The Extraordinary Waiter =

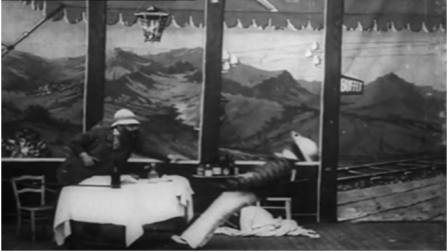
- Screenshot from the film
- Directed by: Walter R. Booth
- Produced by: Robert W. Paul
- Production company: Paul's Animatograph Works
- Release date: December 1902
- Running time: 1 minute 16 secs
- Country: United Kingdom
- Language: Silent

The Extraordinary Waiter (AKA: Diner and Waiter Comic) is a 1902 British silent comic trick film, directed by Walter R. Booth, featuring a brutish colonialist failing to destroy a blackfaced waiter. The film "makes for somewhat uncomfortable viewing," but according to Michael Brooke of BFI Screenonline, "it's just about possible to read this as a metaphor for the rather more widespread frustrations arising from British colonial rule (the Boer War was still a current issue), though it seems unlikely that this was intentional on Booth's part."
