= The '?' Motorist =

1906 British silent film by Walter R. Booth

- Directed by: Walter R. Booth
- Produced by: Robert W. Paul
- Cinematography: Robert W. Paul
- Production company: Paul's Animatograph Works
- Distributed by: Robert W. Paul (1906), BFI Video (2005), Kino Video
- Release date: October 1906
- Running time: 3 minutes
- Country: United Kingdom
- Language: silent

The '?' Motorist is a 1906 British silent comedy trick film, commonly called "The Mad Motorist" or "Questionmark Motorist" and directed by Walter R. Booth. Released in October 1906, the film is "one of the last films that W.R. Booth made for the producer-inventor R.W. Paul," and, according to Michael Brooke of BFI Screenonline, "looks forward to the more elaborate fantasies that Booth would make for Charles Urban between 1907 and 1911, as well as drawing on a wide range of the visual tricks that Booth had developed over the preceding half-decade."

Booth later remade the film as The Automatic Motorist in 1911. The film has also been compared to the work of Georges Méliès and "The Impossible Voyage."

== Plot ==
The film features a couple on the run from the police. While running from the police, they end up driving over the policeman, who magically recovers seconds after and continues to run after the car. Soon the couple comes to a building and their car magically drives up the wall, evading the stunned policeman and leaving an amazed crowd behind. The car drives past stars on clouds, around the Moon, and around the rings of Saturn before crashing through the roof of Handover Courthouse. The car drives through the courthouse and outside once more, interrupting the hearing. Outside on the road, a policeman and court officials stop the car which suddenly turns into a horse and carriage. While the policeman is looking away, the horse and carriage turns back into a car again, and the couple drives off again, victoriously having escaped a ticket.

== See also ==
- 1906 in film
- 1906 in science fiction
