= The Unfortunate Policeman =

- Full film
- Produced by: Robert W. Paul
- Production company: Paul's Animatograph Works
- Release date: 1905
- Running time: 3 mins 37 secs
- Country: United Kingdom
- Language: Silent

The Unfortunate Policeman is a 1905 British short silent comedy film, produced by Robert W. Paul, featuring a policeman chasing a young painter after he tips a pot of paint over him. The film is an "elaborate chase comedy," which according to Michael Brooke of BFI Screenonline, "is an example of the increasing use of real locations in R.W. Paul's work." Film historian Ian Christie adds, "the irreverent and disrespectful treatment of the policeman would soon become impossible in British films, thanks to the notorious list of proscriptions laid down by the British Board of Film Censors shortly after its creation in 1912."
