= The Hand of the Artist =

- Screenshot from the film
- Directed by: Walter R. Booth
- Production company: Charles Urban Trading Company
- Release date: April 1906
- Running time: 8 mins
- Country: United Kingdom
- Language: Silent

The Hand of the Artist is a 1906 British short silent trick film, directed by Walter R. Booth, featuring the director's hand bringing to life photographic images of a young man and woman only for each sequence to end in them being crumpled up. The film features stop-action substitution to achieve its effect and has erroneously been described as the first British animated film.

The film survives as part of the Corrick Collection of the Corrick family entertainers who toured Australia and the world between 1901 and 1914.
