= Undressing Extraordinary =

- Directed by: Walter R. Booth
- Produced by: Robert W. Paul
- Production company: Paul's Animatograph Works
- Release date: 1901
- Running time: 3 minutes 10 secs
- Country: United Kingdom
- Language: Silent

Undressing Extraordinary (AKA The Troubles of a Tired Traveller) is a 1901 British silent comic trick film directed by Walter R. Booth, featuring a tired traveller struggling to undress for bed. The short, which lasts 3 minutes 10 seconds, "provides one of the earliest filmed examples of something that would become a staple of both visual comedy and Surrealist art: that of inanimate objects refusing to obey natural physical laws, usually to the detriment of the person encountering them," and, according to Michael Brooke of BFI Screenonline, "has also been cited as a pioneering horror film," as, "the inability to complete an apparently simple task for reasons beyond one's control is one of the basic ingredients of a nightmare."

The film, however, is a remake of Georges Méliès's 1900 2-minute short Le Déshabillage impossible.
