= The Haunted Curiosity Shop =

- Directed by: Walter R. Booth
- Produced by: Robert W. Paul
- Production company: Paul's Animatograph Works
- Release date: 1901
- Running time: 1 min. 55 seconds
- Country: United Kingdom
- Language: Silent

The Haunted Curiosity Shop is a 1901 British silent horror trick film directed by Walter R. Booth, featuring an elderly curio dealer alarmed by various apparitions that appear in his shop.

The film "was clearly devised purely as a showcase for Booth and Paul's bag of tricks", and according to Michael Brooke of BFI Screenonline, is "an effective and engrossing experience".
