= Robert W. Paul =

British cinema pioneer

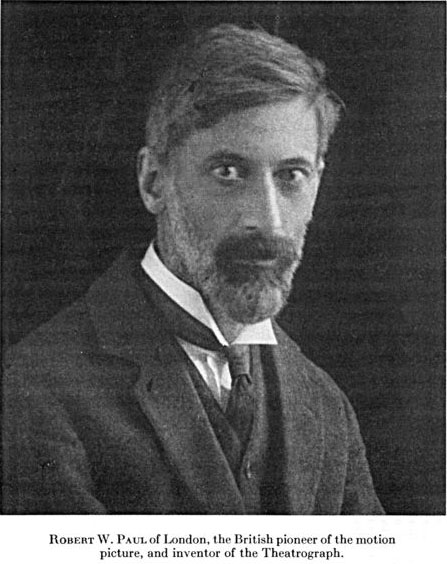
- Born: Robert William Paul; 3 October 1869; Islington, London
- Died: 28 March 1943 (aged 73); Putney, London
- Occupation: Electrician
- Known for: The Theatrograph

Robert William Paul (3 October 1869 – 28 March 1943) was an English pioneer of film and scientific instrument maker.

He made narrative films as early as April 1895, which were shown first in Edison Kinetoscope knockoffs. In 1896 he showed his films projected, at about the time the Lumière brothers were pioneering projected films in France.

His first notably successful scientific device was his Unipivot galvanometer.

In 1999, the British film industry erected a commemorative plaque on his building at 44 Hatton Garden, in central London.

== Early career ==
Paul was born in Islington in London, and educated at the City of London School. He began his technical career learning instrument-making skills at the Elliott Brothers, a firm of London instrument makers founded in 1804, followed by the Bell Telephone Company in Antwerp. In 1891, he established an instrument-making company, the Robert W. Paul Instrument Company, and established a workshop at 44 Hatton Garden, London, which later became his office.

In 1894, he was approached by two Greek businessmen who wanted him to make copies of an Edison Kinetoscope that they had purchased. He initially refused until learning that Edison had not patented the invention in Britain. Paul purchased a Kinetoscope, reverse-engineering a model that could be manufactured in Britain. He manufactured a number of these - according to one account of his "200" but later revised this to "60".

However, the only films available were 'bootleg' copies of those produced for the Edison machines. As Edison had patented his camera (the details of which were a closely guarded secret), Paul resolved to solve this bottleneck by creating his own camera. Via a mutual friend, Henry W. Short, Paul was introduced to Birt Acres, a photographic expert and much-respected photographer who was the General Manager at Elliott & Son's photographic works. Acres had been working on a machine for rapid photographic printing, so Paul applied his discoveries in producing the "Paul-Acres Camera", as named by historian John Barnes, in March 1895. It was the first camera made in England, capable of shooting film in Edison's 35mm format.

On 24 October 1895, Paul applied for a patent for a device to evoke the effects that H. G. Wells had described in his novel The Time Machine, published the previous year monthly before being collected in a single volume edition the following year. Audiences would be given the illusion of traveling backwards or forwards in time, of seeing in close-up or at a distance life in eras long before or after their own times.

Paul wrote, "The Spectators should be given the sensation of voyaging from the last epoch to the present, or the present epoch may be supposed to have been accidentally passed and a present scene represented on the machine coming to a standstill, after which the impression of travelling forward again to the present epoch may be given, and the re-arrival notified by the representation on the screen of the place at which the exhibition is held ..." The patent was never completed and nothing came of it.

== Film innovation ==
Paul obtained a concession to operate a kinetoscope parlour at the Earls Court Exhibition Centre, and the success of this venture inspired him to attempt surpassing Edison by projecting moving images onto a screen. While Paul and Birt Acres shared innovator status for creating Britain's first 35mm camera, they quickly dissolved the partnership to operate as competitors in the film camera and projector markets.

Acres presented his projector at the Royal Photographic Society on 14 January 1896 to much acclaim. Paul presented his own, the Theatrograph, shortly after on 20 February at Finsbury Park College.

In 1896, he pioneered a system of projecting motion pictures onto a screen using a double Maltese cross system, coinciding with the Lumière brothers' projection system. After some demonstrations before scientific groups, he was asked to supply a projector and staff to the Alhambra Music Hall in Leicester Square, and he presented his first theatrical programme on 25 March 1896. This included films shot by Birt Acres, featuring cartoonist Tom Merry drawing caricatures of the German Emperor Kaiser Wilhelm II (1895) and Prince Bismarck (1895). Merry had previously performed his lightning-fast drawing as part of a music hall stage act. Nearby, the Lumière brothers showcased their projections at Empire Music Hall. The use of his Theatrograph in music halls across England helped popularize cinema among the British population. To support the many showmen interested in making films of local interest, Paul established a separate manufacturing department focused on cameras, projectors, and cinema equipment with a dedicated office and showroom.

Continuing his innovations with portable cameras, Paul built the 'Cinematograph Camera No. 1' in April 1896, the first camera to feature reverse-cranking. This mechanism allowed for the same film footage to be exposed several times. The ability to create super-positions and multiple exposures was used in Paul's 1901 film Scrooge, or, Marley's Ghost, the oldest known film adaptation of Charles Dickens' A Christmas Carol. French filmmaker Georges Méliès began his career using cameras built by Paul.

In 1898, he designed and constructed Britain's first film studio in Muswell Hill, North London.

The British Film Catalogue credits Paul's Our New General Servant (1898) with the "first use of intertitles".

== Extended career ==
Throughout his career, Paul continued to see internationally renowned instruments like the Unipivot galvanometer, winning gold medals at the 1904 St. Louis World's Fair and 1910 Brussels International Exposition. Upon the outbreak of World War I, he began producing military instruments, including early wireless telegraphy sets and instruments for submarine warfare. In December 1919, the Cambridge Scientific Instrument Company took over the smaller but successful Robert W. Paul Instrument Company, becoming The Cambridge and Paul Instrument Company Ltd. The name was shortened to the Cambridge Instrument Co Ltd in 1924 when it was converted to a public company.

Paul continued to make his own films that pioneered techniques such as close-up framing and cut transitions, selling them either directly or through newer new distribution companies. While Paul exited the film industry by early 1910, his importance was recognized among contemporaries through the moniker 'Daddy Paul'.

Without prior knowledge of Paul's contributions to film, the technology company Kinetic purchased the 44 Hatton Garden property in London in 1994, renaming it Kinetic House. In 1999, the British film industry commemorated the work of Paul by erecting a commemorative plaque on the building, an event attended by film industry actors and union members, such as Sir Sydney Samuelson, the first British Film Commissioner.

== Selected filmography ==
The Unfortunate Policeman, (1905)

Hyde Park Bicycling Scene 1896

Filmed by Birt Acres:

- The Derby (1895)
- Footpads (1895)
- The Oxford and Cambridge University Boat Race (1895)
- Rough Sea at Dover (1895)

Made independently:

- Blackfriars Bridge (1896)
- Comic Costume Race (1896)
- A Sea Cave Near Lisbon (1896)
- The Soldier's Courtship (1896)
- The Twins' Tea Party (1896)
- Two A.M.; or, the Husband's Return (1896)
- Robbery (1897)
- Come Along, Do! (1898)
- A Switchback Railway (1898)
- Tommy Atkins in the Park (1898)
- Our New General Servant (1898)
- Children in the Nursery (1898)
- The Miser's Doom (1899)
- Upside Down; or, the Human Flies (1899)
- Army Life; or, How Soldiers Are Made (1900)
- Chinese Magic (1900)
- Krugers Dream of an Empire (1900)
- Hindoo Jugglers (1900)
- A Railway Collision (1900)
- Artistic Creation (1901)
- Cheese Mites; or, Lilliputians in a London Restaurant (1901)
- The Countryman and the Cinematograph (1901)
- The Devil in the Studio (1901)
- The Haunted Curiosity Shop (1901)
- The Magic Sword (1901)
- An Over-Incubated Baby (1901)
- Scrooge, or, Marley's Ghost (1901)
- Undressing Extraordinary (1901)
- The Waif and the Wizard (1901)
- The Extraordinary Waiter (1902)
- A Chess Dispute (1903)
- An Extraordinary Cab Accident (1903)
- The Voyage of the Arctic (1903)
- Mr. Pecksniff Fetches the Doctor (1904)
- The Unfortunate Policeman (1905)
- The '?' Motorist (1906)
- Is Spiritualism A Fraud? (1906)

== Legacy ==
In April 2019, the Bruce Castle Museum held a 150th anniversary exhibition curated by Ian Christie entitled "Animatograph! How Cinema was Born in Haringey".

In August 2019, the Barnet London Borough Council approved a proposal by Lipton Plant Architects to have the Light House project involving flats, a supermarket, and car park in London's Muswell Hill suburb to include an unusual shimmering void cutout as a tribute to Paul's work in early film.

In November 2019, the National Science and Media Museum in Bradford opened an exhibition, The Forgotten Showman: How Robert Paul Invented British Cinema, dedicated to Paul and his work in the film industry. It remained open from 22 November 2019 to 21 February 2021 with intervening closures due to the COVID-19 pandemic.
