= 1903 in France =

- Decades: 1880s; 1890s; 1900s; 1910s; 1920s
- See also: History of France; Timeline of French history; List of years in France

Events from the year 1903 in France.

== Incumbents ==
- President: Émile Loubet
- President of the Council of Ministers: Emile Combes

== Events ==
- 10 August – Paris Métro train fire kills 84 people mostly at Couronnes station.

== Arts ==
- Paul Gauguin - Paysage avec un cochon et un cheval
- Jacqueline Marval - Les Odalisques
- Henri Ottmann - Vue de la gare du Luxembourg à Bruxelles
- Pablo Picasso
  - Le Vieux Guitariste aveugle
  - Portrait bleu de Angel Fernández de Soto
  - La Vie
- Théo van Rysselberghe - La Lecture par Émile Verhaeren

== Film ==
- Georges Méliès
  - Le Revenant
  - Faust aux enfers
  - Le Puits fantastique
  - Le Cake-Walk infernal
  - Le Chaudron infernal
  - L'Auberge du bon repos
  - Le Royaume des fées
  - La Lanterne magique
  - Le Mélomane
  - Un malheur n'arrive jamais seul
  - Le Monstre
  - La Boîte à malice
  - L'Oracle de Delphes
  - Le Portrait spirite
  - Le Bourreau turc
  - Le Sorcier

== Literature ==
- René Boylesve - L'Enfant à la balustrade
- Joris-Karl Huysmans - L'Oblat
- John Antoine Nau - Force ennemie

== Music ==
- Claude Debussy - Estampes
- Gabriel Fauré - Morceau de Concours
- Alphonse Hasselmans - Prélude, Op. 51
- Jules Massenet - Piano Concerto
- Gabriel Pierné - Konzertstück, Op. 39
- Camille Saint-Saëns - Valse langoureuse, Op. 120
- Erik Satie - Je te veux

== Sport ==
- 1 July – First Tour de France begins.
- 19 July – Tour de France ends, won by Maurice Garin.

== Births ==
=== January to March ===
- 16 January – William Grover-Williams, motor racing driver and war hero.
- 13 February – Georges Simenon, writer (died 1989)
- 21 February
  - Anaïs Nin, writer (died 1977)
  - Raymond Queneau, poet and novelist (died 1976)
- 27 February – Fernand Gambiez, General and military historian (died 1989)
- 8 March – Jean d'Eaubonne, art director (died 1970)
- 9 March – André Godinat, cyclist (died 1979)

=== April to June ===
- 8 May – Fernandel, actor (died 1971)
- 15 May – Germaine Dieterlen, anthropologist (died 1999)
- 22 May – Yves Rocard, physicist (died 1992)
- 2 June – Max Aub, author, playwright and literary critic (died 1972)
- 18 June – Raymond Radiguet, author (died 1923)
- 25 June – Pierre Brossolette, journalist and Resistance fighter (died 1944)
- 28 June – André Maschinot, soccer player (died 1963)

=== July to September ===
- 25 July – André Fleury, composer, pianist and organist (died 1995)
- 15 August – Pascal Pia, writer, journalist, illustrator and scholar (died 1979)
- 19 August – Claude Dauphin, actor (died 1978)
- 29 August – Jean Follain, author, poet and lawyer (died 1971)

=== October to December ===
- 1 October – Pierre Veyron, motor racing driver (died 1970)
- 10 October – Ferdinand Le Drogo, cyclist (died 1976)
- 16 October – Cécile de Brunhoff, storyteller (died 2003)
- 18 October – Raoul Dutheil, footballer (died 1945)
- 19 October – Jean Delsarte, mathematician (died 1968)
- 23 October – The French Angel, professional wrestler (died 1954)
- 24 October – Charlotte Perriand, architect and designer (died 1999)
- 1 November – Jean Tardieu, artist, musician, poet and author (died 1995)
- 3 November – Charles Rigoulot, weightlifter, professional wrestler, race car driver and actor (died 1962)
- 9 November – Léon-Étienne Duval, Cardinal (died 1996)
- 15 November – Lucien Rebatet, author, journalist and intellectual (died 1972)
- 27 November – Julien Moineau, cyclist (died 1980)
- 30 November – Claude Arrieu, composer (died 1990)
- 17 December – Roland de Vaux, priest and archaeologist (died 1971)
- 23 December – Armand Blanchonnet, cyclist and Olympic gold medallist (died 1968)

=== Full date unknown ===
- Maryse Choisy, philosophical writer (died 1979)
- Pierre Naville, writer and sociologist (died 1993)

== Deaths ==
- 28 January
  - Augusta Holmès, composer (born 1847)
  - Robert Planquette, composer of songs and operettas (born 1848)
- 5 March – Gaston Paris, writer and scholar (born 1839)
- 14 March – Ernest Legouvé, dramatist (born 1807)
- 28 March – Émile Baudot, telegraph engineer (born 1845)
- 8 May – Paul Gauguin, painter (born 1848)
- 16 May – Sibyl Sanderson, American operatic soprano (born 1865 in the United States)
- 13 November – Camille Pissarro, painter (born 1830)

=== Full date unknown ===
- Jean-Jules Allasseur, sculptor (born 1818)
- Louis-Arsène Delaunay, actor (born 1826)

== See also ==
- List of French films before 1910
