= 1903 in film =

The year 1903 in film involved many significant events in cinema.

== Events ==
- Thomas Edison demolishes "America's First Movie Studio", the Black Maria.
- The United States Court of Appeals for the Third Circuit decides that federal copyright protection for "photographs" extends to motion pictures, and that filmmakers could copyright films as a whole rather than having to separately register each frame.
- The three elder Warner Bros. begin in the exhibition business and open their first theater, the Cascade.
- Gaston Méliès, Georges' brother, opens a branch of Star Film in New York to defend its production's copyrights.
- Adolph Zukor and Marcus Loew partner with Mitchell Mark to expand his chain of movie theaters.
- William N. Selig's war film A Soldier's Dream is released. The film shows soldiers playing cards and music around a campfire. Scholars have speculated that the double-exposed image used to create one soldier's dream sequence may have been inspired by Méliès.

== Notable films ==
=== A ===
Electrocuting an Elephant.

- Alice in Wonderland, directed by Cecil Hepworth and Percy Stow, based on the 1865 novel by Lewis Carroll – (UK)
- The Apparition (Le Revenant), directed by Georges Méliès – (France)

=== C ===
- Capital Execution (Henrettelsen), directed by Peter Elfelt – (Denmark)
- A Chess Dispute, directed by Robert W. Paul – (UK)

=== D ===
- The Damnation of Faust, directed by Georges Méliès – (France)
- A Daring Daylight Burglary, by Frank Mottershaw – (UK)
- Desperate Poaching Affray, directed by William Haggar – (UK)
- Diving Lucy, produced by Mitchell and Kenyon – (UK)

=== E ===
- Electrocuting an Elephant, directed by Edwin S. Porter – (US)
- The Enchanted Well (Le Puits fantastique), directed by Georges Méliès – (France)
- An Extraordinary Cab Accident, directed by Robert W. Paul – (UK)

=== F ===
- Faust and Mephistopheles, directed by Alice Guy – (France)
- From Show Girl to Burlesque Queen, directed by A. E. Weed – (US)

=== G ===
- The Gay Shoe Clerk, directed by Edwin S. Porter – (US)
- The Georgetown Loop (Colorado), directed by Billy Bitzer – (US)
- The Great Train Robbery, directed by Edwin S. Porter, starring Broncho Billy Anderson – (US)

=== H ===
- Hiawatha, the Messiah of the Ojibway (lost), directed by Joe Rosenthal – (Canada)

=== I ===
- The Infernal Cake Walk (Le Cake-Walk infernal), directed by Georges Méliès – (France)
- The Infernal Cauldron (Le Chaudron infernal), directed by Georges Méliès – (France)
- The Inn Where No Man Rests (L'Auberge du bon repos), directed by Georges Méliès – (France)

=== K ===
- The Kingdom of the Fairies (Le Royaume des fées), directed by Georges Méliès – (France)

=== L ===
- Life and Passion of the Christ (Vie et Passion du Christ), directed by Lucien Nonguet and Ferdinand Zecca – (France)
- Life of an American Fireman, directed by Edwin S. Porter – (US)

=== M ===
- The Magic Lantern (La Lanterne magique), directed by Georges Méliès – (France)
- Mary Jane's Mishap, directed by George Albert Smith – (UK)
- The Melomaniac (Le Mélomane), directed by Georges Méliès – (France)
- A Message from Mars (lost), by Franklyn Barrett – (NZ)
- Misfortune Never Comes Alone (Un malheur n'arrive jamais seul), directed by Georges Méliès – (France)
- Momijigari (Viewing Scarlet Maple Leaves), directed by Tsunekichi Shibata, based on the 15th-century kabuki play by Kanze Nobumitsu – (Japan)
- The Monster (Le Monstre), directed by Georges Méliès – (France)
- The Mysterious Box (La Boîte à malice), directed by Georges Méliès – (France)

=== O ===
- Old London Street Scenes, directed by George Albert Smith – (UK)
- The Oracle of Delphi (L'Oracle de Delphes), directed by Georges Méliès – (France)

=== P ===
- Panorama of Beach and Cliff House, produced by the American Mutoscope and Biograph Company – (US)
- Petticoat Lane – (UK)

=== R ===
- Rip Van Winkle, directed by William K. L. Dickson, based on the 1819 short story by Washington Irving – (US)
- Runaway Match, directed by Alf Collins – (UK)

=== S ===
- The Sick Kitten, directed by George Albert Smith – (UK)
- Skyscrapers of New York City, from the North River, directed by J.B. Smith – (US)
- A Spiritualistic Photographer (La Portrait Spirite), directed by Georges Méliès – (France)

=== T ===
- The Terrible Turkish Executioner (Le Bourreau turc), directed by Georges Méliès – (France)

=== U ===
- Uncle Tom's Cabin, directed by Edwin S. Porter, based on the 1852 novel by Harriet Beecher Stowe – (US)

=== W ===
- What Happened in the Tunnel, directed by Edwin S. Porter – (US)
- The Witch's Revenge (Le Sorcier), directed by Georges Méliès – (France)

== Births ==
- January 6
  - Stanley Smith, American actor and singer (died 1974)
  - Francis L. Sullivan, English actor (died 1956)
- January 7 – Alan Napier, English actor (died 1988)
- January 10 – Violet Wilkey, American child actress (died 1976)
- January 16 – Peter Brocco, American actor (died 1992)
- January 17 – Warren Hull, American actor, singer and television personality (died 1974)
- January 18 – Werner Hinz, German actor (died 1985)
- February 8 – Greta Keller, Austrian-American cabaret singer and actress (died 1977)
- February 11 – Rex Lease, American actor (died 1966)
- February 14 – Stuart Erwin, American actor (died 1967)
- February 16 – Edgar Bergen, American ventriloquist, comedian, actor, vaudevillian and radio performer (died 1978)
- February 27 – Reginald Gardiner, English actor (died 1980)
- February 28 – Vincente Minnelli, American stage director film director (died 1986)
- March 2 – William Haade, American actor (died 1966)
- March 3 – Adrian, American costume designer (died 1959)
- March 4 – Dorothy Mackaill, British-American actress (died 1990)
- March 17 – Dorothy Seastrom, American silent film actress (died 1930)
- March 20 – Edgar Buchanan, American actor (died 1979)
- March 25 – Binnie Barnes, English actress (died 1998)
- March 28 – Charles Starrett, American actor (died 1986)
- April 9 – Ward Bond, American character actor (died 1960)
- April 12 – Luis Moglia Barth, Argentine film director and screenwriter (died 1984)
- April 17
  - Louis Jean Heydt, American character actor (died 1960)
  - Leonid Kinskey, Russian-American actor (died 1998)
- April 26 – Dorothy Sebastian, American actress (died 1957)
- May 2 – Bing Crosby, American singer, comedian, entertainer and actor (died 1977)
- May 4 – Paul Demel, Czech actor (died 1951)
- May 8 – Fernandel, French comic actor (died 1971)
- May 12 – Wilfrid Hyde-White, English actor (died 1991)
- May 14 – Billie Dove, American actress (died 1997)
- May 15 – Anny Ondra, Czech actress (died 1987)
- May 18 – George E. Stone, Polish-American actor (died 1967)
- May 29 – Bob Hope, American comedian, actor, entertainer and producer (died 2003)
- June 16 – Ona Munson, American actress (died 1955)
- June 18 – Jeanette MacDonald, American soprano and actress (died 1965)
- June 20 – Eddie Laughton, British-American actor (died 1952)
- June 25 – Anne Revere, American actress (died 1990)
- June 29 – Ellen Pollock, British character actress (died 1997)
- July 1 – Don Beddoe, American character actor (died 1991)
- July 2 – LeRoy Mason, American actor (died 1947)
- August 9 – Tom Tyler, American actor (died 1954)
- August 14 – Millard Mitchell, Cuban-American character actor (died 1953)
- September 13 – Claudette Colbert, American actress (died 1996)
- September 17 – Dolores Costello, American actress (died 1979)
- September 29 – Ted de Corsia, American actor (died 1973)
- October 20 – John Davis Lodge, American film actor, lawyer, politician, and diplomat (died 1985)
- October 22 – Curly Howard, American comedian and actor (died 1952)
- November 7 – Dean Jagger, American actor (died 1991)
- November 12 – Jack Oakie, American actor (died 1978)
- November 19 – Nancy Carroll, American actress (died 1965)
- December 5 – Johannes Heesters, Dutch-German actor (died 2011)
- December 10 – Una Merkel, American actress (died 1986)
- December 12 – Yasujirō Ozu, Japanese filmmaker (died 1963)
- December 13 – Norman Foster, American film director, screenwriter and actor (died 1976)
- December 16 – Hardie Albright, American actor (died 1975)
- December 21 – Maria Balcerkiewiczówna, Polish actress (died 1975)
- December 26 – Elisha Cook Jr., American character actor (died 1995)

== Deaths ==
- January 4 - Topsy(elephant) (born c.1875)
- c. February 15 – Julie Verstraete-Lacquet, Flemish actress, dies at 69

== Debut ==
G. M. Anderson
