= List of American films of 1903 =

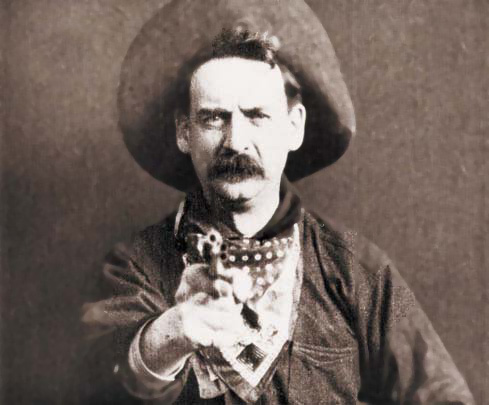
The Great Train Robbery

A list of American films released in 1903.

Title	Director	Cast	Genre	Notes
After Dark; or, the Policeman and His Lantern				
Alice in Wonderland	Cecil Hepworth	May Clark		
At Work in a Peat Bog				
Automobile Explosion				
The Ascent of Mont Blanc				
Bicycle Dive				
Bloodhounds Tracking a Convict				
Buying a Baby				
Cliff Scenery at the Fabbins				
Close Quarters, with a Notion of the Motion of the Ocean				
Cruelty on the High Seas				
A Coach Drive from Glengariffe to Kenmore				
Discovered Through an Opera Glass				
A Drove of Wild Welsh Mountain Ponies				
The Delhi Camp Railway				
DeVoy's Revolving Ladder Act				
The Deserter				
The Effects of a Trolley Car Collision				
Firemen to the Rescue				
The Goose Takes a Trolley Ride				
Egyptian Fakir with Dancing Monkey				
Electrocuting an Elephant	Edwin S. Porter or Jacob Blair Smith,		Documentary	
English Barnyard Scene				
Every Day Is Sunshine When the Heart Beats True				
Fire!				
Fife Getting Instructions from Committee				
Fun on Board a Fishing Smack				
The Gay Shoe Clerk	Edwin S. Porter			
The Great Train Robbery	Edwin S. Porter		Western	Thought to be the first Western.
Hop Picking				
How to Shut Up a Quarrelsome Wife				
Light Heavyweight Championship Contest Between Root and Gardner				
Little Tich and His Funny Feet				
Murder Scene from 'King of the Detectives'				
Moses in the Bullrushes				
Murphy's Wake				
New York Harbor Police Boat Patrol Capturing Pirates				
Nicholas Nickleby	Alf Collins	William Carrington		
Old Irish Cabin				
On the Bow River Horse Ranch at Cochrane, North West Territory				
Only a Soldier Boy				
Our New Cook				
Over the Garden Wall				
Panorama of the Lakes of Killarney from Hotel				
Passengers Embarking from S.S. Augusta Victoria, at Beyrouth				
The Pigeons, Place St. Marc, Venice				
Pittsburgh Fire Department in Full Run				
Polo Match for the Championship at Hurlingham				
The Puzzled Bather and His Animated Clothes				
Quarrelsome Neighbours				
Railway Ride in the Alps				
Reproduction of the Corbett-McGovern Fight				
Rock of Ages				
The Runaway Match, or Marriage by Motor				
Saturday Shopping				
Scene in Canada -- Logging at Bear Creek				
Scene in Canada -- Spearing Salmon in a Mountain Stream				
A Search for Evidence				
Sensational Hurdle Race				
A Shocking Accident				
S.S. St. Louis				
Street Car Chivalry				
A Substantial Ghost				
The Tragical Tale of a Belated Letter				
The Tramp's First Bath				
A Trip Through the Gap of Dunloe				
A Trip to the Giant's Causeway				
Trouble in Hogan's Alley				
Trout Fishing, Landing Three Pounder				
True Love Never Runs Smooth				
Turning the Tables				
Two Little Vagabonds; or, The Pugilistic Parson				
The Unexpected Bath				
An Up-to-Date Studio				
A Visit to the Zoo				
Wait Till Jack Comes Home				
What Happened in the Tunnel				
Wiring Pike in a Mill Stream				
The Workman's Paradise				

== See also ==
- 1903 in the United States
