= Delirium in a Studio =

1907 film by Georges Méliès

- Surviving footage of Delirium in a Studio
- Directed by: Georges Méliès
- Starring: Georges Méliès; Manuel
- Production company: Star Film Company
- Release date: 1907
- Country: France
- Language: Silent

Delirium in a Studio (French: Ali Barbouyou et Ali Bouf à l'huile) was a 1907 French silent trick film by Georges Méliès. It was sold by Méliès's Star Film Company and is numbered 1014–1017 in its catalogues. A fragment of the film survives.

== Plot ==
Méliès's American catalogue reports the following action, covering the part of the film now presumed lost: A painter is working on a full-length portrait of a woman in exoticized dress, with help from a bottle of whiskey. Suddenly he realizes that, whenever he puts the bottle down, his servant is also stealing a taste. The painter goes to hide the whiskey bottle, and the servant seizes the opportunity to drink the whole contents of two other bottles. The painter returns just as the servant's stomachaches make him realize that these two bottles contained not whiskey, but paint. The angry painter thrashes the servant, finally hitting him with a saber. The servant falls unconscious. The painter, thinking he has accidentally murdered his servant, hurriedly stuffs the body in a nearby trunk and drinks himself asleep. When the painter is sleeping in his drunken stupor, the servant sneaks out of the trunk, just as the woman comes to life and steps out of her painting. She plays a series of pranks on the servant, culminating in pouring a bucket of white liquid over his head.

The surviving fragment of the film shows the woman returning to her frame and becoming a painting again. The painter wakes up and is astonished to see the servant swatting the painting with the broom. The painter gives the servant a second thrashing. The fragment concludes with action not mentioned in the catalogue: the painter finally decapitates his servant, stuffing the head and body in the same trunk he had used before. The servant's body, holding its head, climbs out of the box and wanders away. The painter, terrified at the sight, jumps straight into his painting and disappears.

== Production and themes ==
The plot of Delirium in a Studio echoes that of an earlier Méliès film, A Spiritualistic Photographer (1903), while the Orientalist setting may indicate inspiration from the paintings of Eugène Delacroix. Méliès and a frequent collaborator, an actor billed as Manuel, play the master (Ali Barbouyou) and servant (Ali Bouf-à-l'huile) respectively. The film's special effects are worked with substitution splices and dissolves. The scenery, particularly detailed even by Méliès's elaborate standards, includes a large picture frame Méliès had previously used in other films, including The Mysterious Portrait.

A Centre national de la cinématographie guide to Méliès's work notes that, while the final jump into the painting is very Mélièsian in style, this is one of Méliès's few films in which a magic disappearance is not followed by a final return suggesting a curtain call. Other examples without a final reappearance include Bob Kick, the Mischievous Kid (1903), The Marvellous Wreath (1903), and Satan in Prison (1907), assuming the endings of those films are complete in their surviving prints.
