= The Genii of Fire =

- Directed by: Georges Méliès
- Production company: Star Film Company
- Release date: 1908
- Country: France
- Language: Silent

The Genii of Fire (French: Le Génie du feu) is a 1908 French short silent film by Georges Méliès. It was sold by Méliès's Star Film Company and is numbered 1069–1072 in its catalogues.

== Plot ==
A young man and woman, wandering a lushly forested landscape, come across a ruined temple. An old man at the entrance warns the couple not to enter the temple, but they disregard him in their curiosity. Inside, they are surrounded and trapped by temple priests, and they watch in horror as an imp-like spirit fills the temple with fire. The couple are blinded, and stumble back out of the temple, where the old man restores their sight.

== Production ==
Méliès appears in the film as one of the three priests, with the actor Claudel as the young man. The film's set includes columns and scenic elements from two previous Méliès films, The Witch (1906) and Sightseeing Through Whisky (1907), and the costumes include a turban Méliès had worn in Delirium in a Studio (1907). The film's special effects are created with stage machinery, pyrotechnics, substitution splices, multiple exposures, and dissolves.

In its exotic-temple setting, The Genii of Fire is reminiscent of Méliès's earlier film The Oracle of Delphi (1903). Motifs in both films suggest Masonic imagery; though Méliès was not a Freemason, he appears to have been familiar with some of its visual elements, if only through stage spectaculars in the style of Mozart's The Magic Flute. In addition, Méliès's father was a member of the Compagnons du Devoir, a non-Masonic craftsmen's guild with some initiation rites.
