= The Mystical Flame =

1903 film by Georges Méliès

- Directed by: Georges Méliès
- Production company: Star Film Company
- Release date: 1903
- Country: France
- Language: Silent

The Mystical Flame (French: La Flamme merveilleuse) is a 1903 French silent trick film by Georges Méliès. It was sold by Méliès's Star Film Company and is numbered 472 in its catalogues.

== Plot ==
A magician enters in front of an elaborate stage backdrop in forced perspective, and starts doing tricks with a magically expanding handkerchief. Out of it comes a servant in livery, who helps the magician set up draperies and a pedestal. From the pedestal comes a large flame, which, fanned, becomes a woman. As the servant is admiring the woman, she disappears. The magician returns, chases the servant off, but then himself disappears as he sits down. His chair begins rolling away of its own accord before the magician's triumphant reappearance. He makes the servant vanish in a puff of smoke, and dances away merrily.

== Production ==
Méliès plays the magician in the film, which uses substitution splices, multiple exposures, and dissolves for its illusions. Méliès reused the backdrop in his film The Witch's Revenge, made soon after.
