= The Marvellous Wreath =

1903 film by Georges Méliès

- Directed by: Georges Méliès
- Starring: Georges Méliès
- Production company: Star Film Company
- Release date: 1903
- Country: France
- Language: Silent

La Guirlande merveilleuse, sold in the United States as The Marvellous Wreath and in Britain as The Marvellous Hoop, is a 1903 French silent trick film by Georges Méliès. It was sold by Méliès's Star Film Company and is numbered 445–448 in its catalogues.

Méliès plays the musketeer in the film, the main special effect of which is a closeup superimposed into a circular opening by multiple exposure; Méliès used a similar effect in Alcofrisbas, the Master Magician later that year. Other special effects in The Marvellous Wreath are worked using pyrotechnics, substitution splices, and dissolves.
