= Berthe Weill =

French art dealer (1865–1951)

- Born: Esther Berthe Weill; 20 November 1865; Paris, French Empire
- Died: 17 April 1951 (aged 85); Paris, France
- Occupation: Art dealer
- Years active: 1880s–1951
- Organization: Galerie B. Weill

Berthe Weill (20 November 1865 – 17 April 1951) was a French art dealer in the early 20th century French art market. Weill was Picasso's first art dealer before he switched to Clovis Sagot. She was the first and only female art dealer to promote the avant-garde at the start of the 20th century.

== Early life and education ==
Esther Berthe Weill was born on November 20, 1865, in the 1st arrondissement of Paris to Jeanny Lévy, a seamstress, and Salomon Weill, a textile trader. Born into a lower-middle-class Alsatian Jewish family, Weill was the fifth of seven children. She attended school until the age of 10.

== Career ==
=== Apprenticeship ===
As a teenager in the 1880s, Weill began an apprenticeship at Salvador Mayer's antique shop on Rue Laffitte. During her apprenticeship, Weill was introduced to the art critic Claude Roger-Marx, through whom she developed an interest in the work of emerging painters.

Following Mayer's death in 1897, Weill opened a short‑lived gallery on Rue Victor‑Massé with her brother, Marcellin.

=== Galerie B. Weill ===
In October 1900, the Catalan art dealer Pere Mañach introduced Weill to Pablo Picasso.

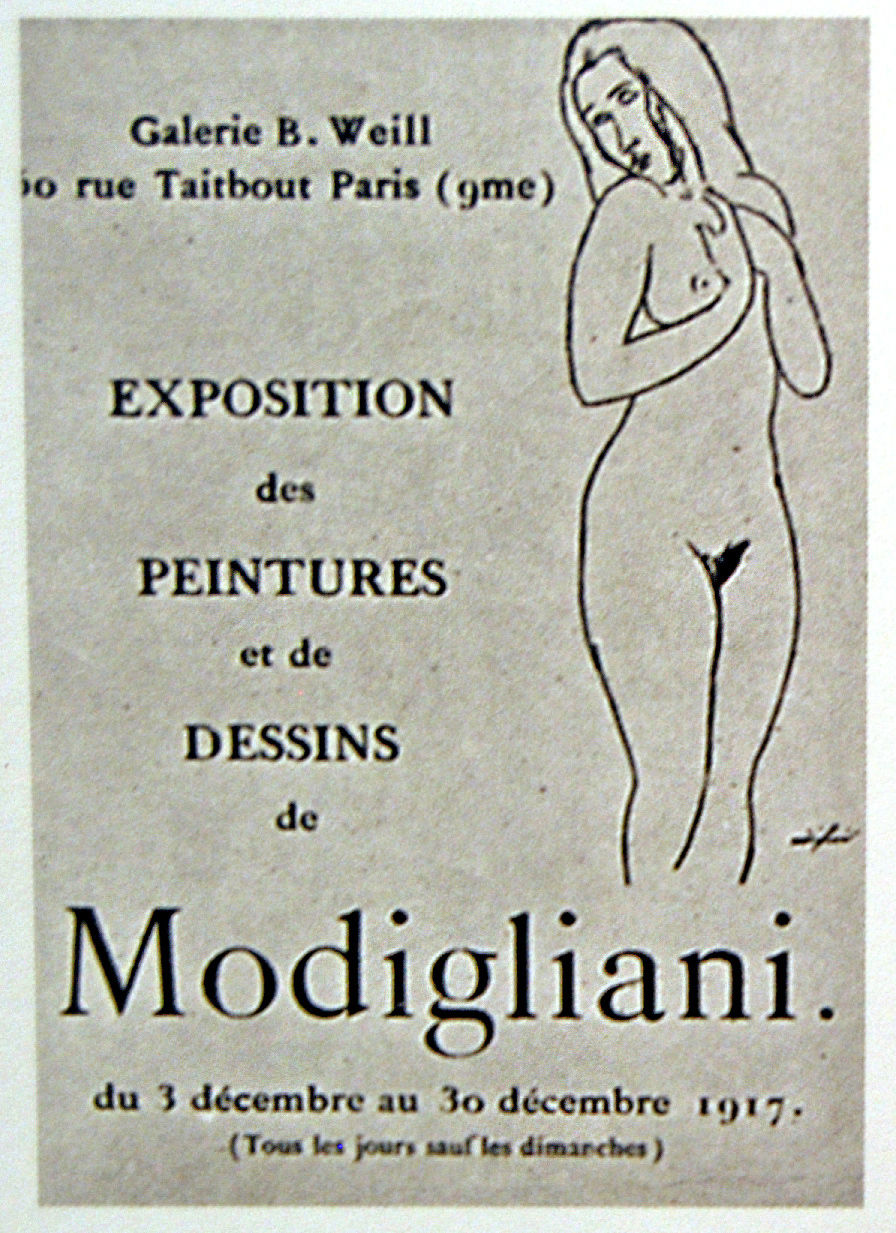
Leaflet for Modigliani's only one‑man exhibition, held at Galerie Berthe Weill in 1917. The exhibition was closed by the police on the grounds of nudity.

On 1 December 1901, Weill used part of her dowry to open "Galerie B. Weill" at 25 Rue Victor‑Massé, calling it "a place for the young". There she bought and sold modernist works, largely Fauvist and Cubist, though the fact that she did not amass a large stock or focus on a single style or coterie may have led some artists to instead go through alternative dealers as their careers progressed. In 1908 and 1909, she exhibited works by Fauves, including Braque, Derain, Manguin, Marquet, Marval, and Matisse. In 1913, she curated a show with works by Gleizes, Léger, and Metzinger. She also hosted a group exhibition with works by Gleizes, Léger, and Picasso.

Galerie Berthe Weill moved in 1917 from 25 Rue Victor‑Massé to 50 Rue Taitbout, and again in 1919 to 46 Rue Laffitte, into the former gallery of Clovis Sagot. At the same time, Weill inaugurated her librairie artistique and launched a publication titled Bulletin.

In 1933, Weill published her memoirs, an account of thirty years as an art dealer.

In 1941, Weill closed her gallery amidst rising antisemitism and the outbreak of World War II.

In 1946, several painters whose work she had promoted organized an auction of donated artworks, with the proceeds used to support her in later life. An estimated ₣1.5 million was raised (equivalent to $147,000 in 2025), which supported Weill until her death.

In 1948, the Republic of France recognized her as a Chevalier of the Légion d'honneur for her contribution to modern art.

== Death ==
Weill died at the age of 85 on April 17, 1951 in the 7th arrondissement of Paris.

== Artists ==
Weill's gallery included works by artists such as Raoul Dufy, André Derain, Maurice de Vlaminck, Diego Rivera, Georges Braque, Kees van Dongen, Maurice Utrillo, Pablo Picasso, François Zdenek Eberl, and Jean Metzinger. She supported the early exposure and sales of female painters such as Suzanne Valadon, Emilie Charmy and Jacqueline Marval. "Of the nearly 400 exhibitions she mounted, one third included works of art by women artists," wrote the New York Times in 2024.

Her gallery also included works by Picasso, Matisse, Jeanne (Jane) Rosoy, Derain, Vlaminck, Marquet, Manguin, Camoin, Raoul Dufy, Diego Rivera, Braque, Friesz, van Dongen, Utrillo, Jean Puy, Metzinger, Odette Des Garets, Modigliani, Rouault, Marie Laurencin, Suzanne Valadon, Emilie Charmy, Kisling, Flandrin, Léger, Pascin, Georges Kars and Émilie Charmy.

== Collectors ==
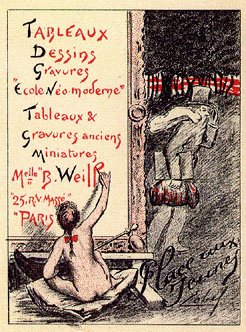
Early 1900s Poster depicting a nude artist and a man in a top hat for a Berthe Weill exhibition

- Adolphe Brisson, literary critic for Le Temps. Picasso's first sales in Paris were three pastels on canvas depicting bullfighting scenes, which Weill sold to Brisson in 1900.
- Arthur Huc, Director of La Dépêche de Toulouse. Weill sold Le Moulin de la Galette (1900) to Arthur Huc. According to John Richardson, Huc was "one of the most progressive collectors of the day". Later, this painting was bought by Justin Thannhauser, who donated it to the Guggenheim Museum (NY).
- Franz Jourdain, Architect of the Samaritaine Department Store, first president of the Salon d'Automne; in 1902, Weill sold a Marquet to him.
- André Level, head of the consortium of investors who, in 1904, began forming the Peau de l'Ours art collection of twentieth-century art. In 1914, it was sold at auction and was notable for its "phenomenal financial success". Weill stated that three-quarters of the items in the collection were purchased from her gallery. While this figure may be an exaggeration, Level is known to have bought from her regularly.
- Gertrude and Leo Stein, American expatriates living in Paris, who promoted and collected avant-garde art
- Olivier Saincère, Councillor of State and future secretary general of the Élysée under Raymond Poincaré, one of Weill's first collectors.
- Gustave Coquiot, French writer and art critic, collector of Maurice Utrillo.
- Sergei Shchukin, Russian collector from Moscow.

== Legacy ==
Contemporary art historians consider that Berthe Weill's pioneering work to promote young artists as Pablo Picasso, Henri Matisse or Amedeo Modigliani has been largely forgotten and underestimated after her death due to the fact that she was a woman and Jewish. She has been recently rediscovered as part of broader scholarly efforts to recover women art dealers.

An exhibition on Weill's legacy, Make Way for Berthe Weill: Art Dealer of the Parisian Avant-Garde, was on display at New York University's Grey Art Museum from October 1, 2024 – March 1, 2025. The exhibit was co-organized by Grey Art Museum, the Montreal Museum of Fine Arts (exhibited May 10 – September 7, 2025), and the Musée de l’Orangerie (exhibited October 8, 2025 – January 26, 2026). The exhibit was accompanied by a catalog by Lynn Gumpert, Marianne Le Morvan, Anne Grace, Stéphane Aquin, Claire Bernardi, Robert Parker, Charles Dellheim, Sophie Eloy, Kirsten Pai Buick, and Ambre Gauthier (ISBN 978-2-080-44720-3).

In 2007, Picasso's portrait of Weill (1920) was designated a French national treasure. In 2009, her memoirs (1933) were republished, and a compilation of her gallery exhibitions was also released; in 2011, Marianne Le Morvan published the first study dedicated to her life and dealership. In February 2012, the City of Paris placed a memorial plaque at 25 Rue Victor Massé, where Weill opened her first gallery in 1900.

The Berthe Weill Archives and Scholarly Research were founded by art historian Marianne Le Morvan and are the foundation of Weill's modern rediscovery. Le Morvan published in 2011 the biography Berthe Weill 1865-1951: La petite galeriste des grands artistes unearthing sales ledgers, correspondence and gallery records.
