= François Zdenek Eberl =

French painter

François Eberl
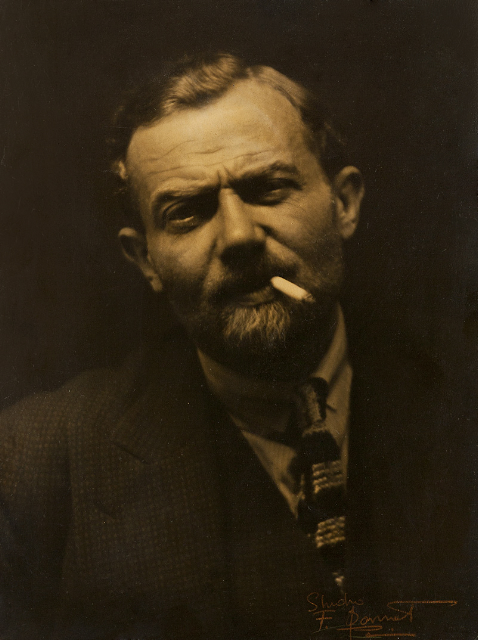
- Born: May 25, 1887; Prague
- Died: October 8, 1962 (aged 75)
- Movement: School of Paris

François Zdenek Eberl (May 25, 1887 – October 8, 1962) was an Austro-Hungarian Empire-born painter who worked mainly in Paris, France. At his prime, his name was included among his fellow painters and personal friends Pablo Picasso, Amedeo Modigliani, and Maurice de Vlaminck.

== Early life and education ==
Frantisek Zdenek Maurice Augustin Eberl was born on May 25, 1887, in Prague into an upper-middle-class family. His parents were both Catholics with Swedish and French ancestry.

Eberl's artistic talent became obvious early on: in 1903, he was admitted to the Academy of Fine Arts in Prague where he and fellow painter Emil Filla studied under Vlaho Buhovac. His artistic temperament, however, was incompatible with the academy's conservative tradition, so Eberl left Prague to travel in Europe.

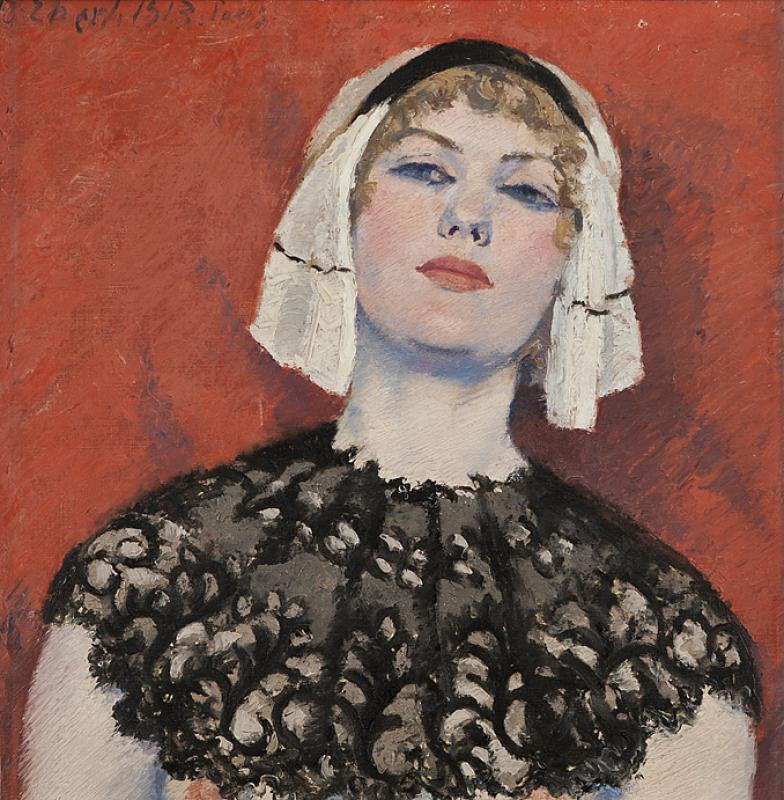
Young Woman, oil on canvas, 1913

In October 1904, Eberl arrived in Munich and enrolled in the Academy of Fine Arts in Munich. He received excellent reviews by his teachers, including artist Franz von Stuck. Soon, Eberl became a teacher at the academy himself; however, negative response to his publication of a few political drawings criticizing Bavarian nobility caused Eberl to leave Germany. In 1911, Eberl settled down in the artists’ quarter of Montmartre and began showing his works in the famous Paris salons of the time.

== Career and private life ==
=== World War I ===
During World War I, Eberl used his talent at caricature drawing and supplied artworks for posters, flyers, and sketches to a Czech organization fighting the Austro-Hungarian Empire. In 1914, he joined the Czech Legion and fought alongside the Allies. After a year and a half on the battlefield, Eberl suffered a serious injury and was honorably discharged. He joined the Red Cross in La Somme. Despite the war raging in Europe, Eberl's works were seen in numerous exhibits to a growing audience of art lovers.

During the war, Eberl married Frida Dohring, a Danish woman. They returned to Montmartre where Eberl gained the friendship and patronage of writers Francis Carco, Pierre Mac Orlan, and Roland Dorgelès. He counted among his friends fellow painters Pablo Picasso, Amedeo Modigliani and Maurice de Vlaminck.

=== Between the wars ===
By 1920 Eberl francofied his name into François Maurice Eberl. His career took off in that decade, and he had several solo exhibits. Art dealer Berthe Weill took an interest and included Eberl in numerous exhibits in her Parisian gallery, and Eberl became a member of the Salon des Artistes Independents and Salon d'Automne. As an independent agent, Eberl arranged art exhibits within and outside France both for himself and other Salon des Artistes members. Eberl's works were regularly on display at the galleries Bernheim-Jeune and Devambez.

The exuberance of the period was on full display in Eberl's private life. He drove racecars for Bugatti, owned a menagerie that included both a lion and crocodile, and with his wife enjoyed the bohemian artist's life that characterizes Paris of that time. In 1928, Francois Eberl was awarded the Legion of Honor by the French government. From 1930 until the end of his life, Eberl spent summers in the Monaco, which he considered his second home.

=== World War II & after ===
During World War II in the early 1940s, Eberl's wife Frida died of a heart condition. Eberl joined the French Resistance, and at great personal risk created political caricatures that were airdropped over occupied areas to mobilize people. He also participated in helping Jews threatened with deportation to escape to Spain. After the war, Eberl was made an honorary citizen and returned to his Parisian workshop in Rue Camille Tahan.

In the late 1940s, Eberl married for the second time to Béatrice Seidl, becoming a stepfather to her nephew Marc-Fréderic. Eberl entered a quieter time with his new family, returning to Eberl's pre-war practice of spending summers in Monaco. Eberl resumed active involvement in Monaco's cultural life and helped arrange art exhibits with important artists.

=== Death ===
On October 8, 1962, Eberl died of cancer in his Paris studio. He is buried in Viliers-le-Bel, near Paris.

== Style and themes ==
Eberl's depiction of Montmartre's gritty nightlife atmosphere with its prostitutes, gamblers, drug addicts, and alcoholics promoted his fame. Drawing inspiration from the folklore of Paris, Eberl preferred to paint street scenes and nightclubs by observation. Eberl was interested in capturing the marginalized lives of the poor in the shadows of glittering Paris. Eberl came from a well-off family and enjoyed financial freedom and success all his life, yet would mingle and paint the so-called ‘lower classes’.

Eberl never compromised his subjects, but rather expressed their full humanity in his paintings. Eberl's Montmartre paintings are the embodiment of a social environment in a given time – the evocation of Bohemian Paris, a mythical place in time when even the streets had a certain grandeur and romantic spirit. Eberl also had a distinctive color palette which made generous use of earthy tones of browns and reds.

== Works in public collections ==
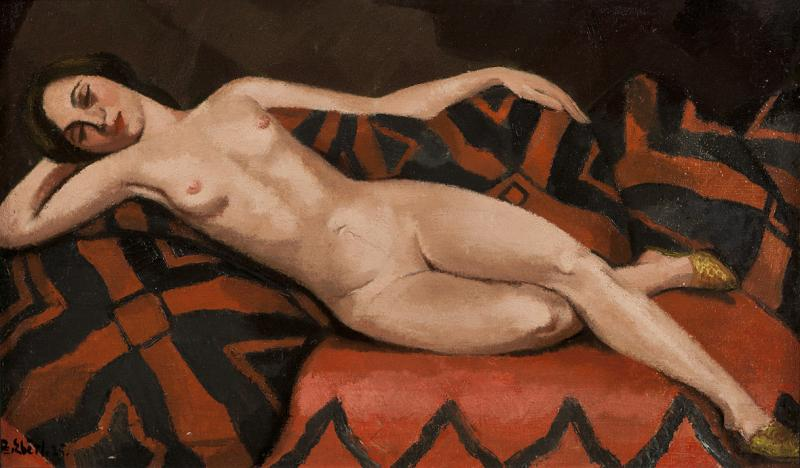
Lounging Nude, oil on canvas, 1925

Eberl's works are in the New National Museum of Monaco, the Musée des Beaux Arts, the Fonds municipal d´art contemporain der Stadt Paris, and the Musées d'art moderne de Saint-Etienne. The Musée du Montparnasse has displayed several works by Eberl in the past, the last time in 2002.
