= The Lilliputian Minuet =

1905 film by Georges Méliès

- Surviving footage of The Lilliputian Minuet
- Directed by: Georges Méliès
- Starring: Georges Méliès
- Production company: Star Film Company
- Release date: 1905
- Country: France
- Language: Silent

The Lilliputian Minuet (French: Le Menuet lilliputien) is a 1905 French silent trick film by Georges Méliès. The film, of which only fragments are known to survive, featured Méliès as a magician making playing-card figures come to life in miniature.

== Plot ==
A magician transforms a marble statue into a living woman, who acts as his assistant. She puts a pack of playing cards in a glass box; four cards (the king of spades, the queen of hearts, the queen of clubs, and the king of diamonds) jump out of the pack into the magician's hands. When the magician puts the four cards on a platform, the kings and queens depicted on them come to life as tiny people, and dance a minuet. Then the kings and queens return to their places on the cards. The magician takes up the cards and makes them disappear, and he and his assistant take a bow.

== Production ==
Méliès is the magician in the film, which reuses props and costumes from The Living Playing Cards, a film he had made earlier in the year. In turn, he reused the effect of superimposing people at different sizes in a film released the following year, The Hilarious Posters. The special effects were created using substitution splices and multiple exposures.

== Release and survival ==
The Lilliputian Minuet was sold by Méliès's Star Film Company and is numbered 690–692 in its catalogues. A print of the film was preserved at the Filmoteca Española in Madrid, with a copy held in the possession of the Méliès family; the print contains a large part of the action, but is missing the ending and part of the statue transformation. A fragment restored by film preservationist David Shepard, and released on home video in 2008, contains only the action from the cards' dance to the end. The film in its complete form is presumed lost.
