= Émilie Charmy =

French painter (1878–1974)

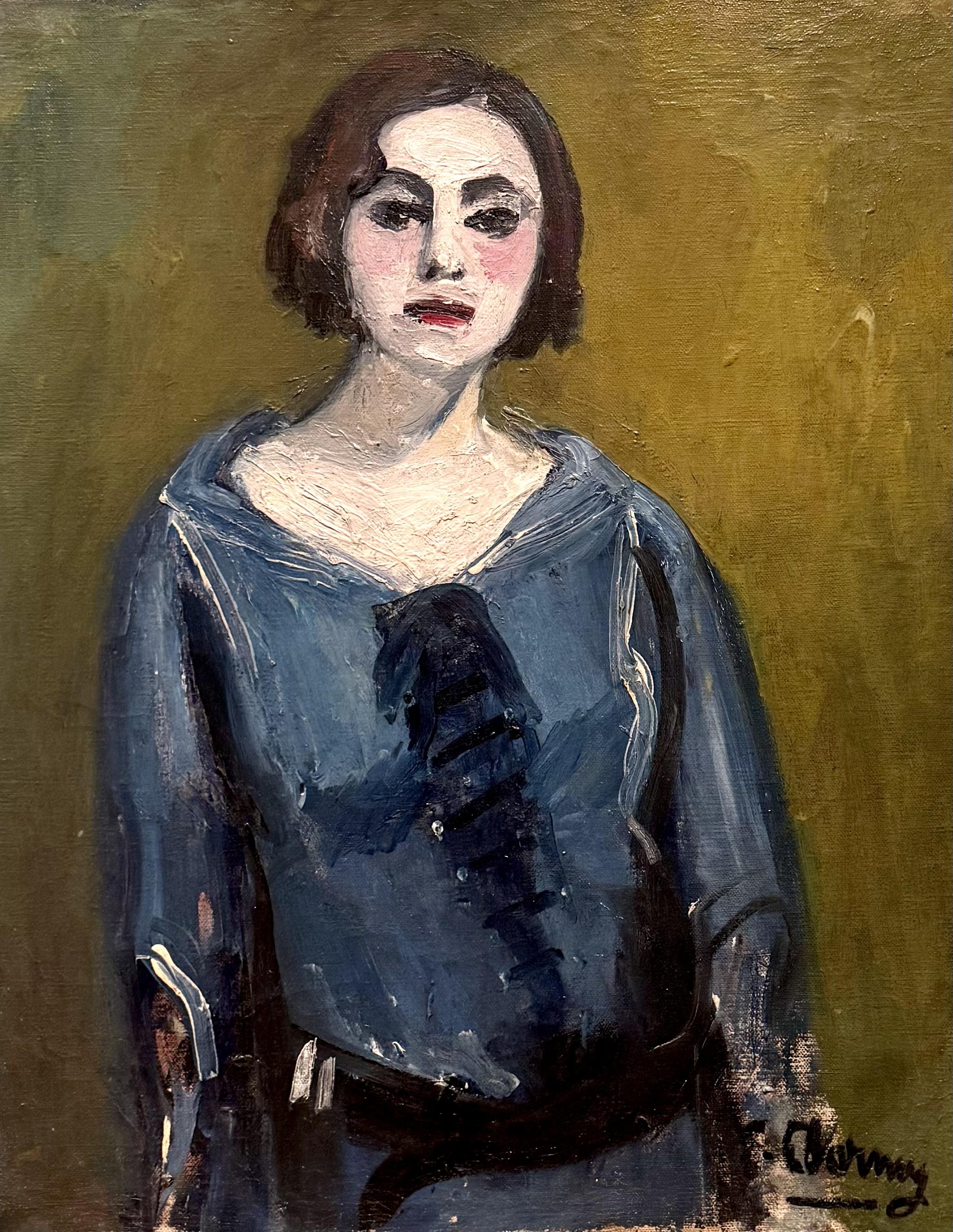
- Self-portrait c. 1906
- Born: Émilie Espérance Barret; April 2, 1878; Saint-Etienne, France
- Died: June 7, 1974 (aged 96); Paris, France
- Education: Jacques Martin
- Known for: Painting
- Movement: Impressionism, Post-Impressionism, Fauvism, School of Paris
- Spouse: George Bouche
- Awards: Legion of Honour – Officer (1938)

Émilie Charmy (French pronunciation: [emili ʃaʁmi]; April 2, 1878 – June 7, 1974) was an artist in France's early avant-garde. She worked closely with Fauve artists like Henri Matisse, and was active in exhibiting her artworks in Paris, particularly with Berthe Weill.

She had become an artist against the norms for French women in her day and became a well-regarded artist. She painted still lifes, landscapes, portraits, and figure paintings. Unusually for a woman at the time, she made a number of paintings of nude women in poses of sexual abandon. Charmy's initial works were Impressionist and Post-Impressionist paintings. As her career evolved, she was influenced by Fauvism and the School of Paris movements.

== Early life ==
Émilie Espérance Barret was born on April 2, 1878, in Saint-Etienne, France.

She grew up in a bourgeois family; her grandfather was Bishop of Toulouse and her father owned an iron foundry. She had two older brothers, one whom died of appendicitis. Orphaned when she was 15, she and her older brother Jean Barret then lived with relatives in Lyon. Émilie had a talent for both art and music as a child.

== Education ==
Émilie received a bourgeois educational training at a Catholic private school, and qualified to become a teacher, which if a woman were to have a career was limited to education. (Note: Shari Benstock recounts that early 20th-century French women's lifestyles "lagged far behind their American and English peers in their efforts to gain political and legal equality." She notes that French women did not enjoy voting or equal pay rights until 1944, and explains that the most influential factors in a woman's life were the church, and Rousseauian ideals of a traditional family unit.)

When living at Lyon, she refused teaching jobs in the late 1890s and went to study and work in the studio of Jacques Martin. This was a critical moment in the further development of her career. Martin was involved with a number of other Lyon artists who became influential in Émilie's artistic development, including Louis Carrand and François Vernay who had a local reputation for a unique approach to flower painting.

During this time she assumed the name Émilie Charmy as her pseudonym.

== Career ==
=== Overview ===
When women were shunned from the French art world, and most women regarded painting as a hobby, Charmy was consumed by her work and was entirely financially dependent on her art. For her, "painting was an obsession which dominated many other aspects of her life". Charmy primarily painted women in domestic or bourgeois settings, as well as pictures of flowers and still-life. Her flower paintings and still-life paintings were very marketable because they were considered decorative, and were sought after by the middle class. In regards to Charmy's nude paintings, Gill Perry proposes that Charmy is intentionally trying to restrict the viewer from the intimate scenes that she depicts.

French novelist Roland Dorgelès described Charmy as "a great free painter; beyond influences and without method, she creates her own separate kingdom where the flights of her sensibility rule alone." There is a great sense of abstraction in her images, with varying opinions by art critics. Her bold use of color and her unapologetic brushstrokes have been deemed as "appropriating...a 'masculine' language of art production", according to her contemporaries. The most famous quote came from Roland Dorgelès:

Émilie Charmy, it would appear, sees like a woman and paints like a man; from the one she takes grace and from the other strength, and this is what makes her such a strange and powerful painter who holds our attention.

It is Charmy's resistance to traditional gender roles that makes her unusual for her time. For her career and depiction of nude women in a period in which that was unusual for women, she epitomized the New Woman of the 19th century and early 20th century.

In terms of the business side of her career, Charmy refused to sign contracts with art dealers and gallery owners, save for one unsuccessful contract with the dealer Pétridès in the early 1930s.

=== Early career ===
In the 1890s, Charmy began making Impressionist and Post-Impressionist paintings of subjects that ranged from prostitutes and brothels to scenes of middle-class family life. For instance, she made orient-influenced Girl with a Fan c. 1898–1900, a morphine addict in Woman in an Armchair c. 1897–1900, a group of nude prostitutes in La Salon, cultured women in Card Players and Interior in Saint-Etienne c. 1897–1900.

In 1902 or 1903, Charmy and her brother left Lyon for Saint-Cloud, near Paris. Charmy exhibited her works in a number of galleries, but they were not exhibited with her male contemporary artists, and therefore were not assessed in the same professional manner as paintings made by male modernist painters. Her first documented show was at the "Salon des Indépendants" in 1904, and it is likely that it was through this show that she befriended other Fauve artists, like Henri Matisse, Charles Camoin, and Albert Marquet.

In 1905 she exhibited two still-life paintings titled Dahlias and Fruit, at the Salon d'Automne. Which were seen and appreciated by Berthe Weill, who from then on promoted her work and became a good friend. In 1906, she showed 5 flower paintings and one still life titled Prunes, also at the Salon d'Automne.

=== Fauvism ===
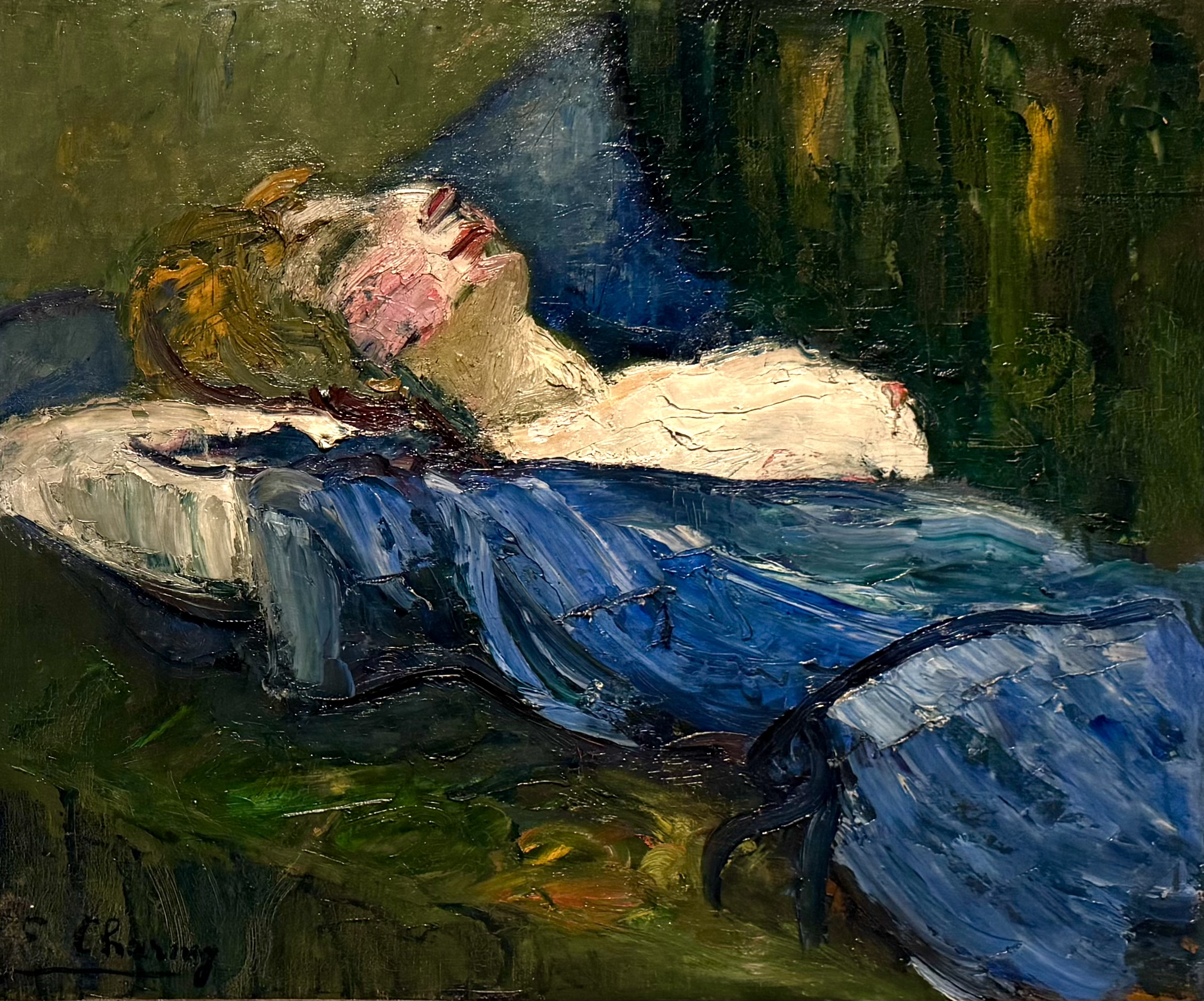
Self-portrait (c. 1906)

Jeune femme tête renversée (Young woman with her head thrown back), 1920, oil on canvas board

Influenced by other artists at the time such as Matisse, she integrated Fauvism techniques into her paintings, as seen in Woman in a Japanese Dressing Gown (1907). As a result of "experiments with colour, thickly applied paint and seemingly crude brushwork she produced a series of bold and technically innovative paintings".

Concerning Woman in a Japanese Dressing Gown, Charmy "adopts a theme which also appears in works by Matisse, Camoin, Derain, and Marquet from 1905, shortly after Matisse's wife had purchased a Japanese kimono and posed in it for members of the group". Their compositions feature the perfect and conventional image of femininity, with all of its decorative, and oriental/primitive references. Charmy's depiction is a significant contrast, as her subject "despite her oriental dressing gown, is represented as the modern woman without the ornamental or coiffured hair. She assumes an almost hieratic standing pose, in the center of the canvas, and stares out somewhat disconcertingly, directly at the viewer. She seems to stand out rigidly against her domestic interior, a rigidity which is emphasized by the use of bright colors outlined in dark brushwork."

Other paintings from this period include the landscapes Piana, Corsica (1906), L'Estaque c. 1910 and Corsican Landscape c. 1910 made when she traveled to the coast of the French Mediterranean and Corsica with Matisse and his friends. An unconventional aspect of her style was to leave parts of her canvas unpainted in this series of paintings, a technique used by her male Fauve counterparts.

Charmy established a studio in Paris at 54 Rue de Bourgogne in 1908. She moved there permanently in 1910 and remained there for the rest of her life.

Paintings that she made of Corsica and the French Mediterranean were exhibited at Eugène Druet's gallery in 1911 in Paris. In 1912, her first major solo exhibition was held at the Galerie Clovis Sagot. It is listed as having a minimum of forty oil paintings and twenty-five watercolors. Charmy is remembered in the United States as being one of the artists who exhibited at the 1913 Armory Show, where she exhibited four works, Roses, Paysage, Soir, and Ajaccio. This exhibition is also where Arthur Jerome Eddy purchased L'Estaque, and he "praised the picture or its arbitrary, abstract colors and bold, decorative composition in his 1914 Cubists and Post Impressionism."

Fellow artist and her lover, George Bouche, had a home in scenic Marnat, which is believed to be the subject of her paintings The Path toward the House and Landscape, made between 1913 and 1915. The works represented a shift to more intimate pictures made with vigorous brushstrokes and a palette of medium-light to dark tones.

=== School of Paris ===
In the 1910s Bertha Weill began exhibiting her work. Her style evolved again during that decade, this time to that of the School of Paris. Her work became increasingly respected by art critics, such as Louis Vauxcelle who in 1921 described her as "one of the most remarkable woman [artists] of our time". Recognizing the difference between Charmy's work and that of the stereotypically refined feminine artist, writer Roland Dorgelès said the same year that she "sees like a woman and paints like a man".

A solo exhibition of her work was held in 1919 at the Galerie André Pesson. Also in 1919, Charmy makes the acquaintance of the Count Etienne de Jouvencel, who becomes a patron of her work. An exhibition of Charmy's work was held at the Galerie Œuvres d’Art in 1921.

=== Feminine Art ===
Hania Routchine, naked, 1921, oil on canvas. "There is a whole harem whose captives sometimes experience, according to Charmy's whim, an hour of light - like this sleeping brunette, this lively and happy brunette..., mirror of the day and all its reflections, a work so warm and so freely distanced from painting" (Colette, 1921)

Women artists were generally banned from art studios or academies during sessions with live models, so many women painted bourgeois life by default. Yet, Charmy's work exhibits an interest in painting female models and prostitutes, including expression of women's sexuality. Such images of women are common among male artists such as Degas, but were rare among women artists. Most women artists were interested in painting an idyllic view of women and their children. Despite Charmy's interest in using female models as subjects for her paintings, she avoided the mother-and-child theme that was becoming increasingly popular, especially with contemporary artists like Mary Cassatt.

Author and art historian Matthew Affron said of Charmy's choice of subject matter that "the key issues in Charmy's putative naturalism – the anthropocentrism, the revival of historical genres, and the modernist conception of brushwork as the sign of artistic expression – came together most vividly in her painting of the nude. Uniformly female, the nudes appear in simple interior settings. Frequently their poses evoke academic and salon-style precedents, including many variations on the single figure standing or seated, prone or supine, or reclined laterally either toward or away from the viewer. Charmy often worked with studio models, and she also was interested in the subgenre of the nude portrait. Some of these images bear such a strong resemblance to the artist that they are considered self-depictions."

There have been many speculations as to why Charmy chose such a controversial subject matter. One interpretation, is that "in adopting a contradictory viewing position (i.e. that of a woman viewing the female sexuality) and a modern technique, she has produced an ambiguous version of a popular contemporary theme... Charmy has appropriated and reworked a 'male gaze' removing some of the erotic pleasure involved in the part of the viewing subject."

In 1921, Charmy had a solo exhibition at the Galerie d'Oeuvres d'Art, and showed paintings of flowers, women, and female nudes. The show caused quite a stir in the Parisian art scene, and sparked a number of critical issues concerning "feminine" art. The show was organized by Count de Jouvencel, who had discovered her at Berthe Weill's gallery in 1919.

Around 1922, Charmy met Colette, whom she befriended. Colette, at that time at the height of her popularity, wrote the introductory text for the catalog of a major exhibition of twenty pictures by Charmy, held in 1922. The same year, Charmy participated in another major exhibition at the Styles Gallery, on the theme of the "Female Nude", which included paintings by Ingres, Delacroix, Corot, Manet, Renoir, Rouault and Matisse, and a catalog prefaced by Louis Vauxcelles.

=== Later years ===
In 1926, another major solo exhibition of Charmy's work was held at the Galerie Barbazanges.

She exhibited her works less frequently in the 1920s and 1930s, but had a number of patrons and collectors who supported her work. Charmy made paintings when she had been at her villa at Ablon-sur-Seine, including two made between 1926 and 1930, View of the Seine at Ablon, which is at the Musée de Grenoble, and Banks of the Seine at Ablon, at Galerie Michel Descours in Lyon. She also painted still lifes, nudes and self-portraits. In the 1930s, Charmy was a member and exhibited her works at Femmes Artistes Modernes.

After the war, Charmy exhibited less often than she had at the height of her career, but she continued to paint into her 90s.

== Awards ==
Charmy was first brought to the attention of France's Legion of Honour awards when she was introduced, through Eli-Joseph Bois (Petit Parisien Director), to several political figures, including Édouard Daladier, Aristide Briand, and Louise Weiss. By decree on 13 January 1926, Charmy received a Legion of honour Knighthood, which was later upgraded to the rank of Officer (decree: 5 August 1938).

== Personal life ==
In 1912 she met the painter George Bouche, and they had a son, Edmond, in 1915. Charmy and Bouche married in 1935.

Edmond, like Charmy, was placed in the care of paid nurses and carers until the age of fourteen. Although this was acceptable during Charmy's childhood, this practice was becoming increasingly rare as traditional roles of motherhood were becoming more popular. In one biography, Edmond notes that "while some mothers glory in their offspring, Charmy hid hers jealously. This newly born knew neither the disorder of the studio nor the smell of paint." Charmy was almost scorned by her art dealer, Berthe Weill, because she viewed Charmy's relationship with her son Edmond as distant and unnatural.

After World War I, Charmy and Bouche had a villa in Ablon-sur-Seine, as well as the studio-apartment in Paris. Her husband died in 1941 and during World War II, she and her son Edmond lived in Marnat in "isolated circumstances". After the war she returned to Paris, but many of the people that she knew in the art community were no longer there.

She died in 1974 in Paris.
