= Pere Mañach =

Catalonian-Spanish art dealer and choreographer (1870–1940)

- Pablo Picasso (1901) "Pedro Mañach"
- Born: Pere Mañach i Jordi; 23 March 1869; Barcelona, Kingdom of Spain
- Died: 1 June 1940 (aged 71); Barcelona, Spanish State
- Other names: Pedro Mañach
- Citizenship: Kingdom of Spain (1869–1873); First Spanish Republic (1873–1874); Kingdom of Spain (1874–1931); Second Spanish Republic (1932–1936); Spanish State (1936–)
- Occupation: Art dealer
- Known for: The first dealer of Pablo Picasso in Paris
- Spouse: Josefa Ochoa (m. 1919)

Pere Mañach i Jordi (23 March 1869 –1 June 1940), known as Pere Mañach, was a Catalonian art dealer, known for being the first dealer of Pablo Picasso in Paris.

== Early life ==
Pere Mañach was born Pere Mañach i Jordi on 23 March 1869 in Barcelona, to Maria Jordi i Casademon (1840–1913) and Salvador Mañach i Trias (1825–1904), a safe and lock manufacturer.

== Career ==
In the mid 1890s Mañach moved to Paris and began selling Modern Spanish art. In 1900, Isidre Nonell introduced Mañach to the 19 year old Pablo Picasso. Mañach subsequently became Picasso's first Parisian art dealer in 1901.

However, the relationship was short lived with Picasso leaving Mañach in 1902 for Berthe Weill.

== Personal life ==
In 1919, Mañach married Josefa Ochoa.

Mañach died on 1 June 1940 in Barcelona aged 71.
