= Diving Lucy =

1903 British silent comedy film

- Production companies: Mitchell & Kenyon
- Release date: 1903
- Country: United Kingdom
- Language: Silent

Diving Lucy is a 1903 British silent comedy film produced by Sagar Mitchell and James Kenyon.

== Plot ==
A policeman is alerted to a pair of female legs protruding from the surface of a pond. He attempts to rescue the woman, but discovers that the legs are fake, with a sign saying "RATS" at the bottom. He then falls in the lake himself.

== Production ==
Diving Lucy was filmed at the boating lake in Queen's Park, Blackburn.

== Reception ==
The film was the most successful Mitchell & Kenyon film. A reviewer in The Talking Machine News described it as a "decided novelty", concluding "we do not remember seeing anything similar before". It was also released in America in February 1904, where the Biograph Company advertised it as "the biggest English comedy hit of the year". Alongside Bio-graph, the film was also distributed by the Edison Manufacturing Company.

== Legacy ==
The popularity of Diving Lucy prompted director Frank Mottershaw to copy the film's premise in a 1907 production entitled Sold Again. In this version, the policeman is not explicitly portrayed as the victim of a practical joke, and the film ends with him being hit by snowballs, rather than falling into the water himself.

A copy of the film survives in the Cinema Museum in London, along with 64 other Mitchell & Kenyon fiction films. It is included as a bonus feature on the American version of the DVD collection Electric Edwardians: The Lost Films of Mitchell & Kenyon, released in 2006 by Milestone Films.
