= The Mysterious Retort =

L'Alchimiste Parafaragaramus ou la Cornue infernale
- Directed by: Georges Méliès
- Produced by: Georges Méliès
- Distributed by: Star Film Company
- Release date: 1906
- Running time: 60 meters/200 feet (2-3 minutes)
- Country: France
- Language: Silent

L'Alchimiste Parafaragaramus ou la Cornue infernale, released in the United States as The Mysterious Retort and in Britain as The Alchemist and the Demon, is a 1906 French silent trick film directed by Georges Méliès. It was released by Méliès's Star Film Company and is numbered 874–876 in its catalogues.

== Plot ==
In a laboratory, an alchemist is working with a large retort on a stove. After consulting a book, he falls asleep in a chair near the retort. As he sleeps, a giant snake comes out of the stove and transforms into a jester, who wakes the alchemist and forces him to look in a hand-mirror. When the alchemist does so, the retort grows much larger, the alchemist falls back to sleep, and a giant spider with a human face appears inside the retort. The spider dissolves into a young woman sprinkling coins onto the ground. Sparks escape from the retort and transform into a ghost. The alchemist wakes in terror, and the giant retort explodes. Two assistants run to the alchemist, who has fallen prostrate on the ground. The jester reappears and stands triumphant over the fallen alchemist.

== Production ==
Méliès appears in the film as the alchemist. Though he often took roles in his own films, The Mysterious Retort marks one of the very few instances in which Méliès's character is defeated and apparently dead at the film's end.

At least two items in the film are recognizable from previous Méliès productions: the alchemist's wizard robe was frequently used, including in A Trip to the Moon (1902), while the puppet snake that comes out of the fire had previously appeared in Rip's Dream (1905). Special effects for the film were created using stage machinery, pyrotechnics, substitution splices, and superimpositions.

== Versions ==
Méliès's pre-1903 films, especially the popular A Trip to the Moon, were frequently pirated by American producers such as Siegmund Lubin. In order to combat the piracy, Méliès opened an American branch of his Star Film Company and began producing two negatives of each film he made: one for domestic markets, and one for foreign release. To produce the two separate negatives, Méliès built a special camera that used two lenses and two reels of film simultaneously.

In the 2000s, researchers at the French film company Lobster Films noticed that Méliès's two-lens system was in effect an unintentional, but fully functional, stereo film camera, and therefore that 3D versions of Méliès films could be made simply by combining the domestic and foreign prints of the film. Serge Bromberg, the founder of Lobster Films, presented 3D versions of The Mysterious Retort and two 1903 Méliès films, The Infernal Cauldron and The Oracle of Delphi, at a September 2011 presentation at the Academy of Motion Picture Arts and Sciences. A similar screening by Bromberg, without The Mysterious Retort but including the other two films, had occurred at a January 2010 presentation at the Cinémathèque Française. According to the film critic Kristin Thompson, "the effect of 3D was delightful … the films as synchronized by Lobster looked exactly as if Méliès had designed them for 3D."

One of the surviving prints of the film, held at the Cinémathèque française, is a stencil-colored version. It is unknown whether Méliès authorized the coloring, as the stencil process is highly unusual in his oeuvre; normally, his films were colored using an entirely freehand method supervised by the colorist Elisabeth Thuillier.
