= Alcofrisbas, the Master Magician =

1903 film by Georges Méliès

- Directed by: Georges Méliès
- Starring: Georges Méliès
- Production company: Star Film Company
- Release date: 1903
- Country: France
- Language: Silent

L'Enchanteur Alcofribas, sold in the United States as Alcofrisbas, the Master Magician and in Britain as The Enchanter, is a 1903 French short silent film by Georges Méliès. It was sold by Méliès's Star Film Company and is numbered 514–516 in its catalogues.

The magician's name, variously spelled Alcofribas or Alcofrisbas, is derived from Alcofrybas Nasier, a character in the book Pantagruel (and a near-anagram of François Rabelais, the book's author). Méliès himself stars as Alcofrisbas; the woman whose head appears in closeup, sometimes misidentified as Jehanne d'Alcy, is unknown. The film's special effects include pyrotechnics, a waterfall, substitution splices, multiple exposures, and dissolves.
