= Talking Machine News =

Defunct English trade magazine

Talking Machine News was an English trade publication dedicated to gramophones and gramophone records.

== History ==
The periodical was established in London, England, in May 1903 as the Talking Machine News and Record Exchange. After the second edition, its title was changed to Talking Machine News and Cinematograph Chronicle. From October 1905 (the thirtieth edition), it was titled simply Talking Machine News. From issue 157, it became Talking Machine News and Journal of Amusements. It ceased publication at some point in the 1930s.

== Content ==
The periodical described itself as "The recognized organ of the trade". It contained record reviews, articles, and technical information about the use and care of gramophones and records. The publication was sometimes issued on a monthly basis, and sometimes had a semimonthly distribution.
