= Landscape with a Pig and a Horse =

1903 painting by Paul Gauguin

- Landscape La Dominique
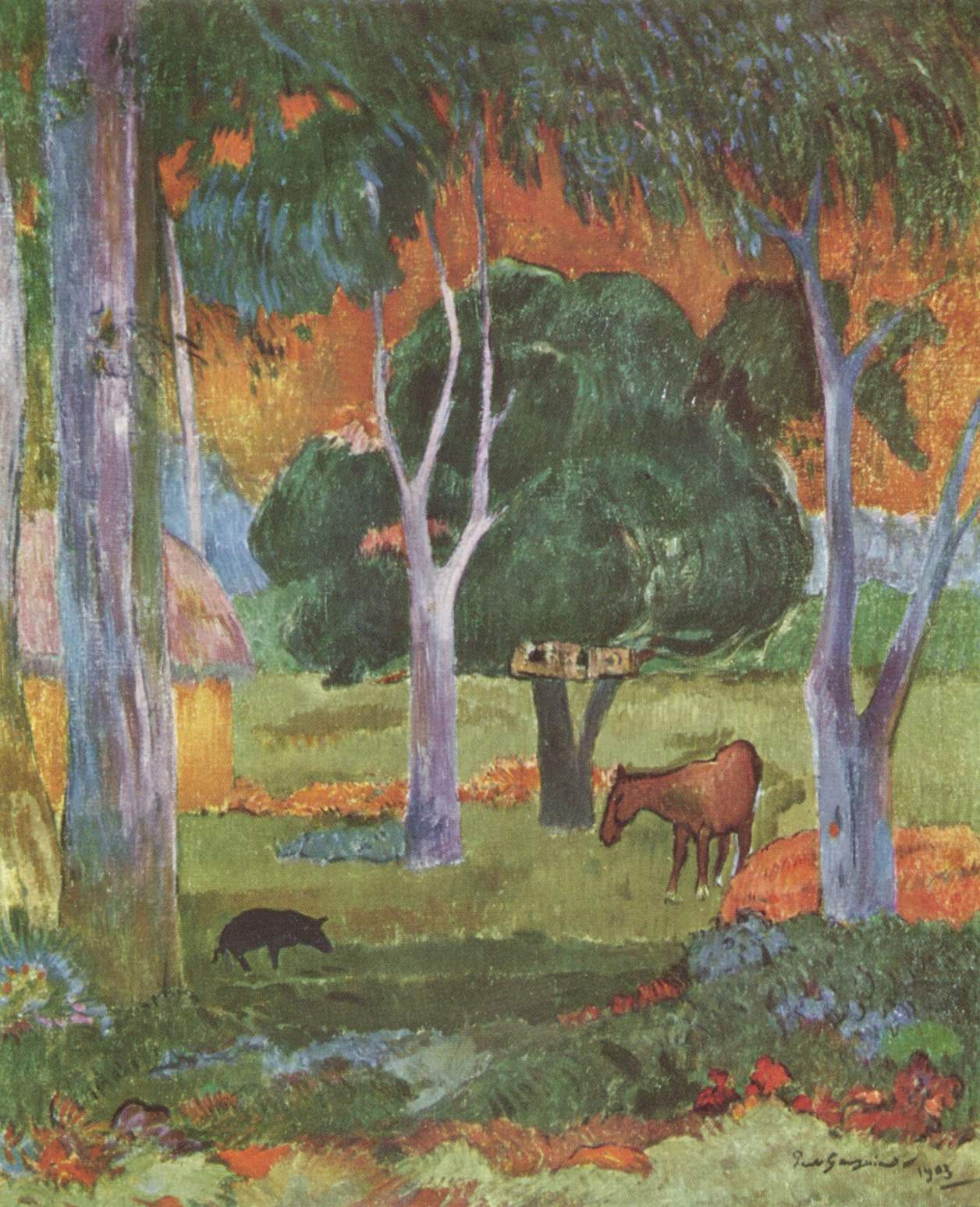
- Artist: Paul Gauguin
- Year: 1903
- Medium: oil on canvas
- Dimensions: 75 cm × 65 cm (30 in × 26 in)
- Location: Ateneum; Helsinki

Landscape with a Pig and a Horse or Landscape, La Dominique is a 1903 oil painting by Paul Gauguin. Since 1908, it has been in the collection of the Ateneum in Helsinki. One of his last works, it was painted on Hiva Oa island.
