= Bob Kick, the Mischievous Kid =

- Directed by: Georges Méliès
- Starring: Georges Méliès
- Production company: Star Film Company
- Release date: 1903
- Country: France
- Language: Silent

Bob Kick, the Mischievous Kid (French: Bob Kick, l'enfant terrible) is a 1903 French silent trick film by Georges Méliès. It was sold by Méliès's Star Film Company and is catalogued as numbered 510–511.

Méliès plays Bob Kick in the film, which uses pyrotechnics, substitution splices, and multiple exposures to create its special effects. This film is one of several trick films by Méliès in which magical effects are used to suggest a theme of illusive female beauty.

Two identical paper prints of the film, representing its American and French releases, are preserved at the Library of Congress. Variant versions of the film may exist; a 1981 guide published by the Centre national de la cinématographie noted that the editors reported that the ending they saw differed from the one summarized by John Frazer in his 1979 book Artificially Arranged Scenes: The Films of Georges Méliès.
