= The Lecture of Emile Verhaeren =

Painting by Théo van Rysselberghe

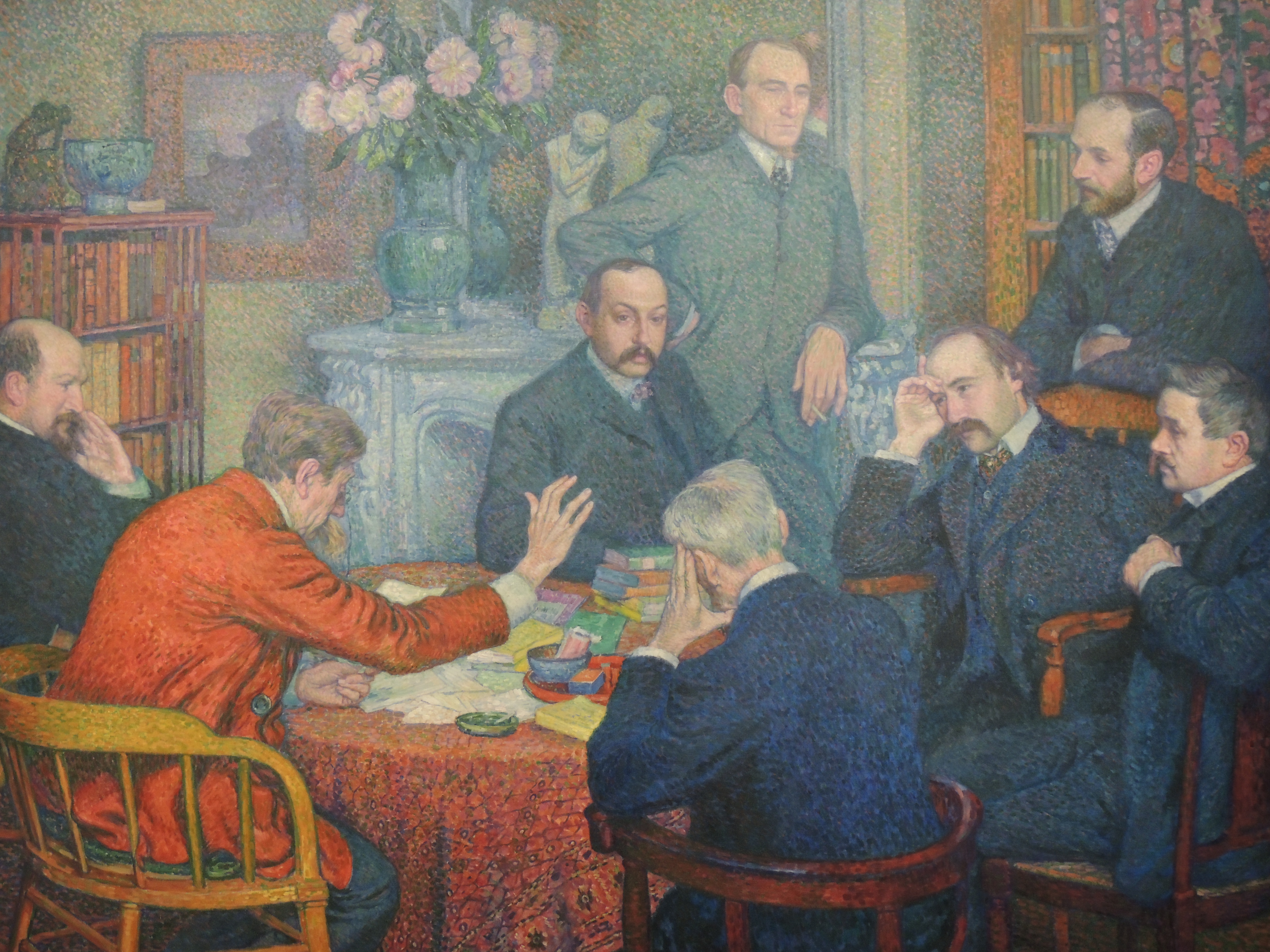
- Artist: Théo van Rysselberghe
- Year: 1892
- Medium: Oil on canvas
- Dimensions: 181 cm × 241 cm (71.2 in × 94.9 in)
- Location: Museum of Fine Arts, Ghent

The Lecture of Emile Verhaeren is an oil on canvas painting by Belgian painter Théo van Rysselberghe. Painted 1903, it is currently house at the Museum of Fine Arts in Ghent.

== Painting ==
The scene is set in an imaginary meeting in Emile Verhaeren's apartment in Saint-Cloud, wherein the poet is reading a passage from his own oeuvre.

The audience, from left to right, includes Félix Le Dantec, Francis Vielé-Griffin, Félix Fénéon, Henri Ghéon, André Gide, Maurice Maeterlinck, and Henri-Edmond Cross.

The relatively modest furniture of the room emphasizes the intellectual and artistic character of the group, but without boasting their prominence. There is a completely filled bookcase on the bottom left (where the action starts); on the wall there hangs a painting by James Abbott McNeill Whistler, close friend of fellow Belgian painter Alfred Stevens, and even a statue by Georges Minne, sitting behind Fénéon, the only artist standing upright among the depicted group. Another filled bookcase appears at the other end of the painting, which is closed off by a curtain that partially covers its bookshelves.

Verhaeren is depicted on the far left, with his back turned to the viewer, and at first glance he may not seem to be the central object in the painting, nor its most important element. However, he is dressed in bright red (a color wherein he habitually dressed), which contrasts with the dull blue of the other group members' clothes. While all other artists, with similar looks on their faces, listen passively to Verhaeren, the latter is active, reading his poem out loud in his red clothes.

Verhaeren is depicted with a forward-leaning posture and a raised hand extending toward the center of the composition, making his figure a prominent focal point of the painting. His mouth is obscured from view, while the positioning of his hand has been interpreted as emphasizing gesture over facial expression. The composition draws attention to Verhaeren through his pose, the diagonal orientation of his body, and the projection of his raised hand. The red color of his jacket further distinguishes him within the composition.

Van Rysselberghe, therefore, expressed his admiration for Verhaeren in many ways in The Lecture of Emile Verhaeren. The poet's hand, moreover, has aristocratic character, with its fingers grouped in groups of two.

== Sources ==
- "Théo Van Rysselberghe The Lecture by Emile Verhaeren, 1903". Museum of Fine Arts of Ghent.
- Ronald Feltkamp (2003). Théo van Rysselberghe, catalogue raisonné. Éditions de l'amateur. pp. 91–95. ISBN 978-2-85917-389-0.
