= The Odalisques =

Painting by Jacqueline Marval

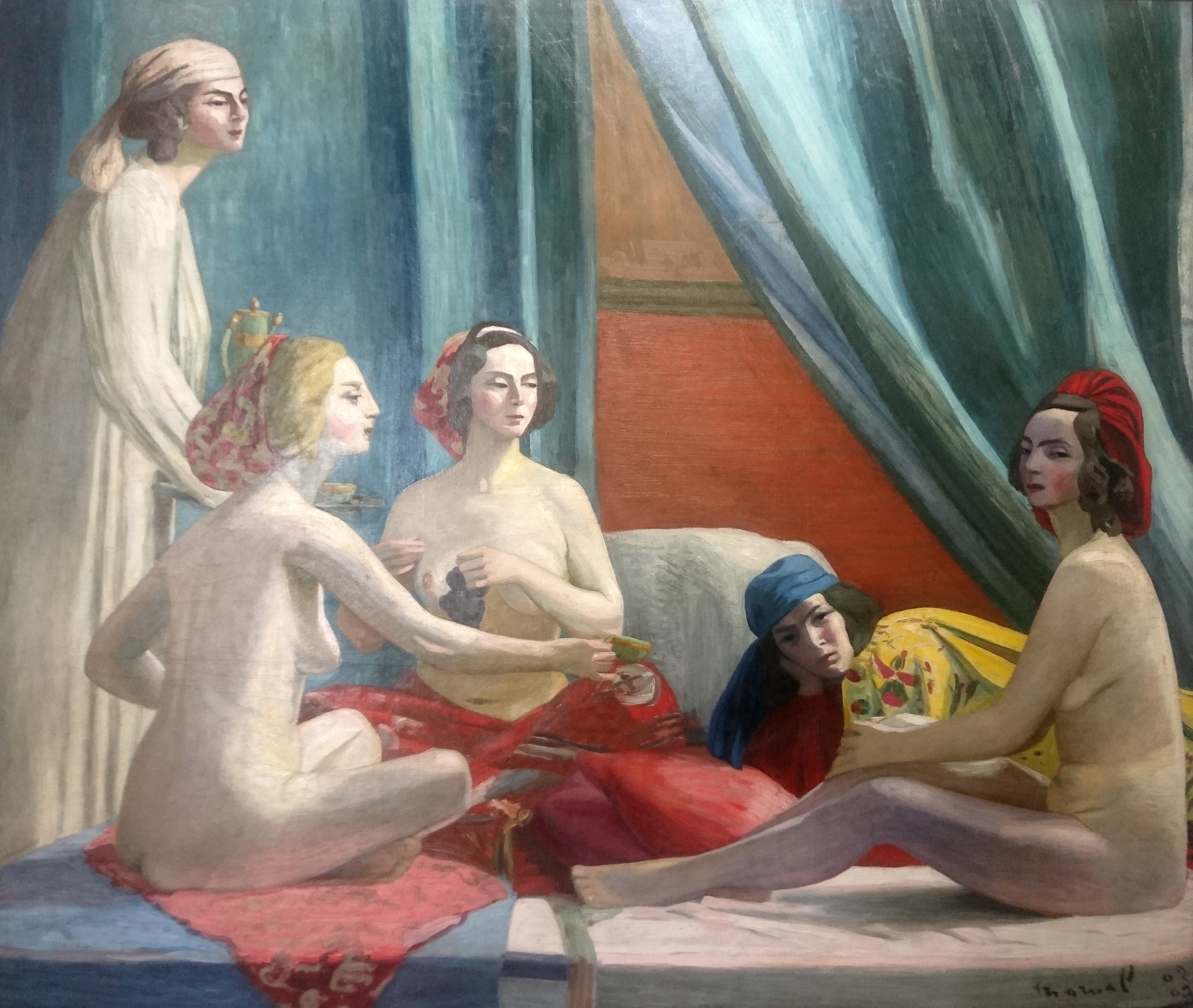

The Odalisques is a 1902-1903 Orientalist oil on canvas painting by Jacqueline Marval, showing five odalisques in an interior (three seated nude, one dressed and reclining on her elbow, and one standing, clothed and holding a tray). It is now in the museum of Grenoble, to which it was given by the artist's sister in 1933, and was last exhibited at the Musée Paul-Dini in 2018.

Exhibited at the Salon des indépendants in 1903, it follows in the art historical tradition of large-scale orientalized bathing scenes, with a strong focus on the nude body and interaction between figures.. Guillaume Apollinaire was struck by the work, and wrote in Chronique des arts in 1912 that "Mme. Marval has given the measure of her talent and has achieved a work of importance for modern painting. This strong and sensual work, freely painted and wholly personal in composition, line, and coloring, deserves to survive." The Odalisques now resides within the collection of the Musée de Grenoble

The Odalisques was not included in the historic 1913 Armory Show, as is frequently noted in literature on the artist. Instead, a different work by Marval, Odalisques looking in a mirror, 1911, was shown at the Armory Show, after an invitation by Vollard. Marval exhibited in the United States a number of additional times after the Armory Show. Some argue it was an inspiration for Pablo Picasso's Demoiselles d'Avignon.
