= A Spiritualistic Photographer =

1903 film directed by Georges Méliès

- Directed by: Georges Méliès
- Starring: Georges Méliès
- Production company: Star Film Company
- Release date: 1903
- Country: France
- Language: Silent

A surviving print of the film

A Spiritualistic Photographer (French: Le Portrait spirite) is a 1903 French silent trick film directed by Georges Méliès. It was released by Méliès's Star Film Company and is numbered 477–478 in its catalogues.

The film parodies the faked images of ghosts created by Spiritualist mediums; Méliès, a fervent critic of Spiritualism, here uses it as an opportunity to show off a new special effect, a transformation created with a dissolve on a white background. Stage magic tricks featuring a similarly mocking attitude toward Spiritualism were often performed in the French fairgrounds for which Méliès produced many of his films. The film's concept can be seen as the reverse of those in Méliès's films The Living Playing Cards and The Lilliputian Minuet; in those films, living people come out of portraits, while in this case the portrait comes second.

Méliès appears in the film as the magician. The gilded setting and stools used here reappear in several of his other films. The special effects were created with pyrotechnics, substitution splices, dissolves, and multiple exposures.

The film survives in the form of a 35mm paper print.
