= Jacqueline Marval =

French painter (1866–1932)

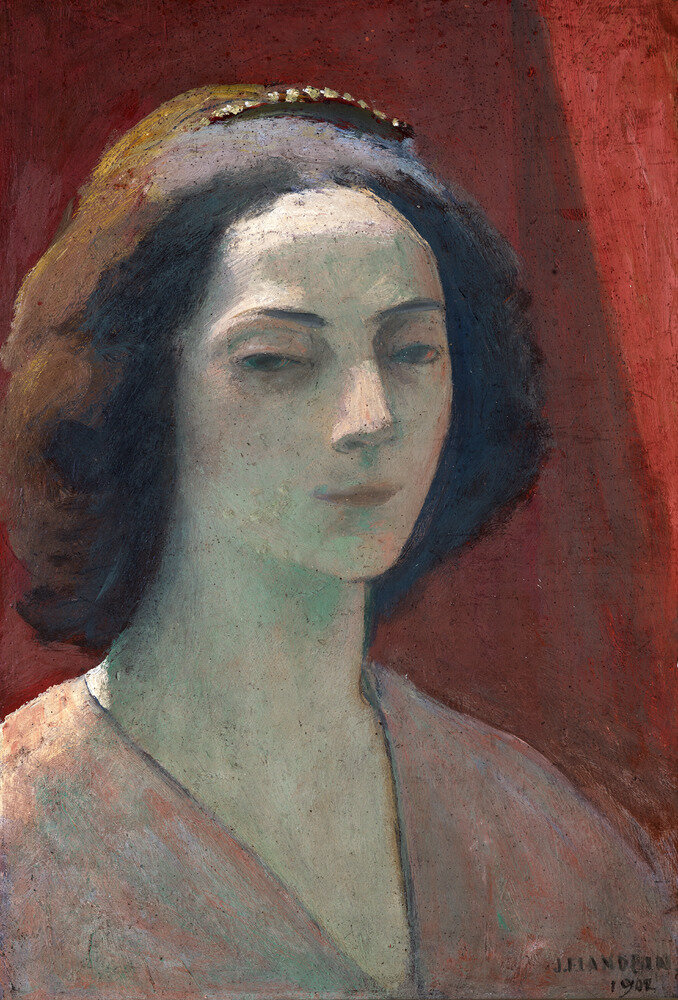
- Portrait by Jules Flandrin (1907)
- Born: Marie Josephine Vallet; 19 October 1866; Quaix-en-Chartreuse, France
- Died: 19 May 1932 (aged 65); Paris, France
- Known for: Painting
- Spouse: Albert Valentin (m. 1886 - d. 1891)
- Partner(s): François Joseph Girot, Jules Flandrin
- Website: www.jacqueline-marval.com

Jacqueline Marval was the pseudonym for Marie Josephine Vallet (19 October 1866 – 28 May 1932), who was a French painter, lithographer and sculptor.

== Early life ==
Vallet was born in Quaix-en-Chartreuse into a family of school teachers. She was married in 1886, to a traveling salesperson, Albert Valentin, but separated from her husband in 1891 after the death of her son. She moved to Grenoble and worked as a seamstress sewing waistcoats before moving to Paris in 1900. In 1900 Vallet took on the pseudonym Jacqueline Marval, "Marval" being the composite of her first and last name "MARie VALlet".

== Career as an artist ==
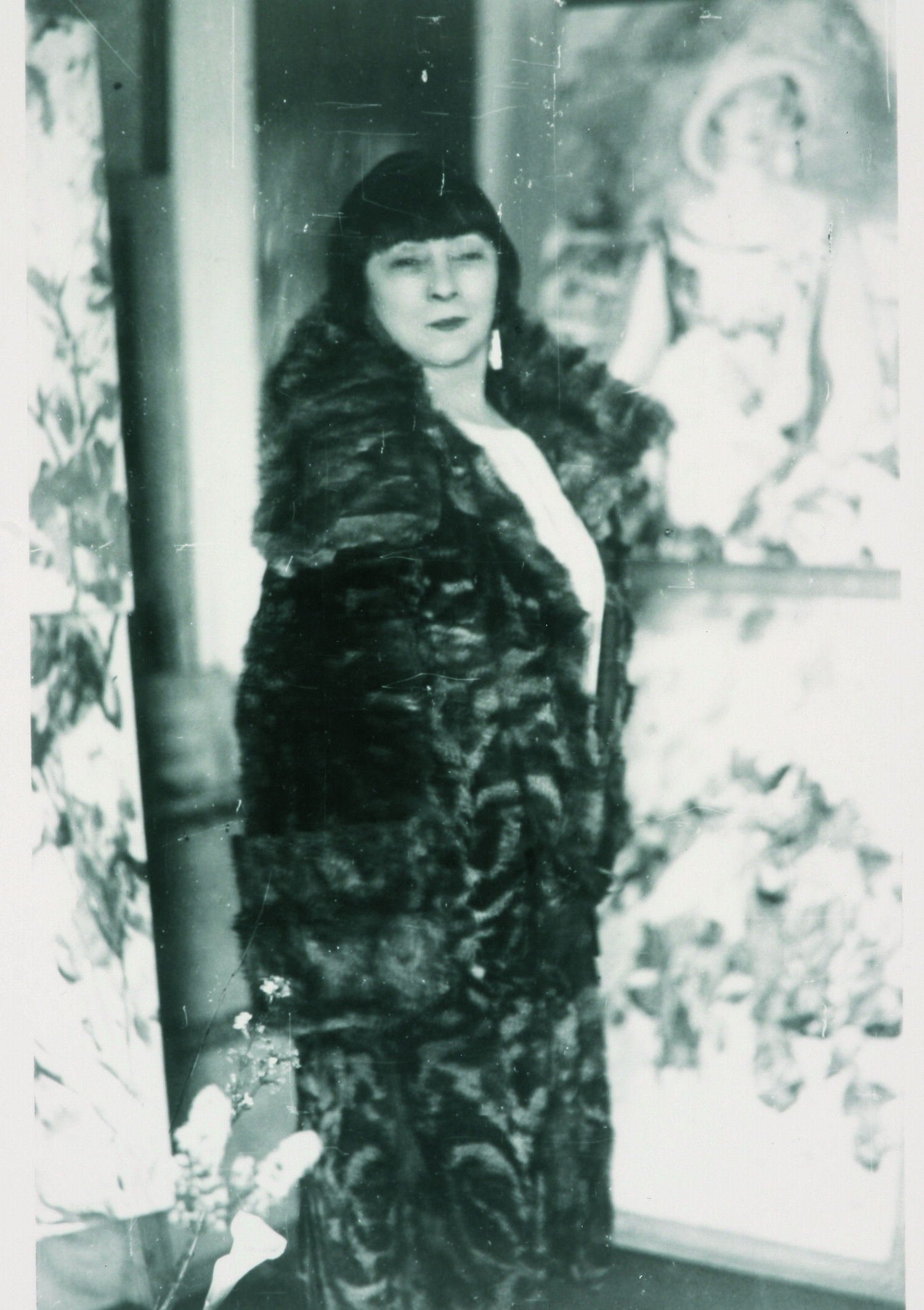
Marval in her apartment, Paris, circa 1925

In 1894, Marval met the painter François Joseph Girot and began living with him in Paris, where she was introduced to Les Nabis group. Girot introduced her to Jules Flandrin, another painter and a student of Gustave Moreau. The two fell in love, and Marval left Girot to move in with Flandrin in Rue Campagne-Première, in the Montparnasse area. She would live with him as his companion for 20 years. As an artist, Marval worked primarily as a painter; however, she also made "lithographs, watercolours, pastels, engravings, tapestry designs and experimented with sculpture."

Vallet's first works were rejected from the 1900 Salon des Indépendants, but she succeeded in having a dozen paintings shown in that exhibition the following year, in 1901. The works rejected in 1900 were bought by the art dealer Ambroise Vollard, who continued to support her work.

Between 1901 and 1905, Marval worked frequently alongside Henri Matisse, Albert Marquet, and Flandrin, and the four influenced each other.

In 1902, several of her paintings were displayed alongside works by Flandrin, Albert Marquet, and Henri Matisse in a gallery in Rue Victor-Massé curated by Berthe Weill, who was particularly interested in promoting the works of female artists living in Paris. Marval also exhibited in the first Salon d'Automne, in 1902, where she showed her large scale painting The Odalisques.

In 1913, Marval was chosen by a jury made up of Gabriel Astruc, the sculptor Antoine Bourdelle, and the painters Maurice Denis and Édouard Vuillard to decorate the foyer of the new Théâtre des Champs-Élysées. She created a series of twelve paintings on the theme of Daphnis and Chloe. The series was based on the Ballets Russes' production of Daphnis et Chloë , performed the year prior.

Also in 1913, Marval protested against the removal from the Salon d'Automne of Kees van Dongen's The Spanish Shawl, and became friends with Van Dongen, setting up her studio near his. Marval and Flandrin moved into 40 rue Denfert Rochereau, which was next door to Van Dongen in 1914. She attended his famous costumed ball in 1914.

Marval's works began to be recognized across Europe and beyond; she exhibited in Barcelona, Liège, Venice, Zurich, Budapest, and Kyoto.

Beginning in 1923, Marval was active in favor of the creation of modern art museums in Paris and Grenoble. Towards the end of her life she fell into poverty. Marval died of cancer at the Hôpital Bichât in Paris in 1932. After her death, her works were held in the Galerie Druet before it was closed in 1938 and they were sold. Her painting Portrait of Dolly Davis, 1925 is in the collection of the Milwaukee Art Museum.

== Critical reception and legacy ==
Critics gave Marval high praise during her career. In a 1911 issue of The Burlington Magazine for Connoisseurs, for example, it was written that at an exhibition at the Druet Gallery, "The paintings of Madame Marval were among the most striking..." Apollinaire, aside from his compliments to Les Odalisques, more generally makes comments on her work that refer to it as exciting, strong, and worthy of recognition. Some critics referred to her as a Fauve, a reflection of her choice of palette, which was heavily influenced by Fauve and Impressionist painters who came before her. According to Lucien Manissieux, a student of Flandrin, "Marquet, Flandrin, Matisse all awaited each work she produced with curiosity and emotion" and there is some evidence that her male peers borrowed from her "brilliant colour and formal economy of her painting."

During her lifetime, Marval refused to exhibit in all-female exhibitions; yet, after her death, her career and work was celebrated in one. The Société des Femmes Artistes Modernes (FAM) was a women artists' collective in Paris. FAM was headed by Marie-Anne Camax-Zoegger (1881-1952), "a bourgeois French Catholic woman." They put on a retrospective of Marval's work in 1933 as part of their annual exhibition. Marval, who did not identify as a feminist, was appropriated by FAM as one and has since been celebrated as living a feminist life. Since her work was figural in nature, it fit well within the focus of FAM, which aimed to "organize annual exhibitions that featured the work of female artists from different countries and stylistic movements'."

Since her death, Marval's work has been exhibited many times, most often in France. A full list of exhibitions has been compiled on the website jacqueline-marval.com. In 2020-21, she was included in the exhibition Valadon et ses contemporaines at the Musée des beaux-arts de limoges, which was also on view at the Monstaère Royal de Brou from 13 March 2021 – 27 June 2021.

The Papillon Gallery wrote that "Marval's paintings are provocative and edgy, challenging and unusual, she was an important modernist at the earliest moments of the movement."

== Gallery ==
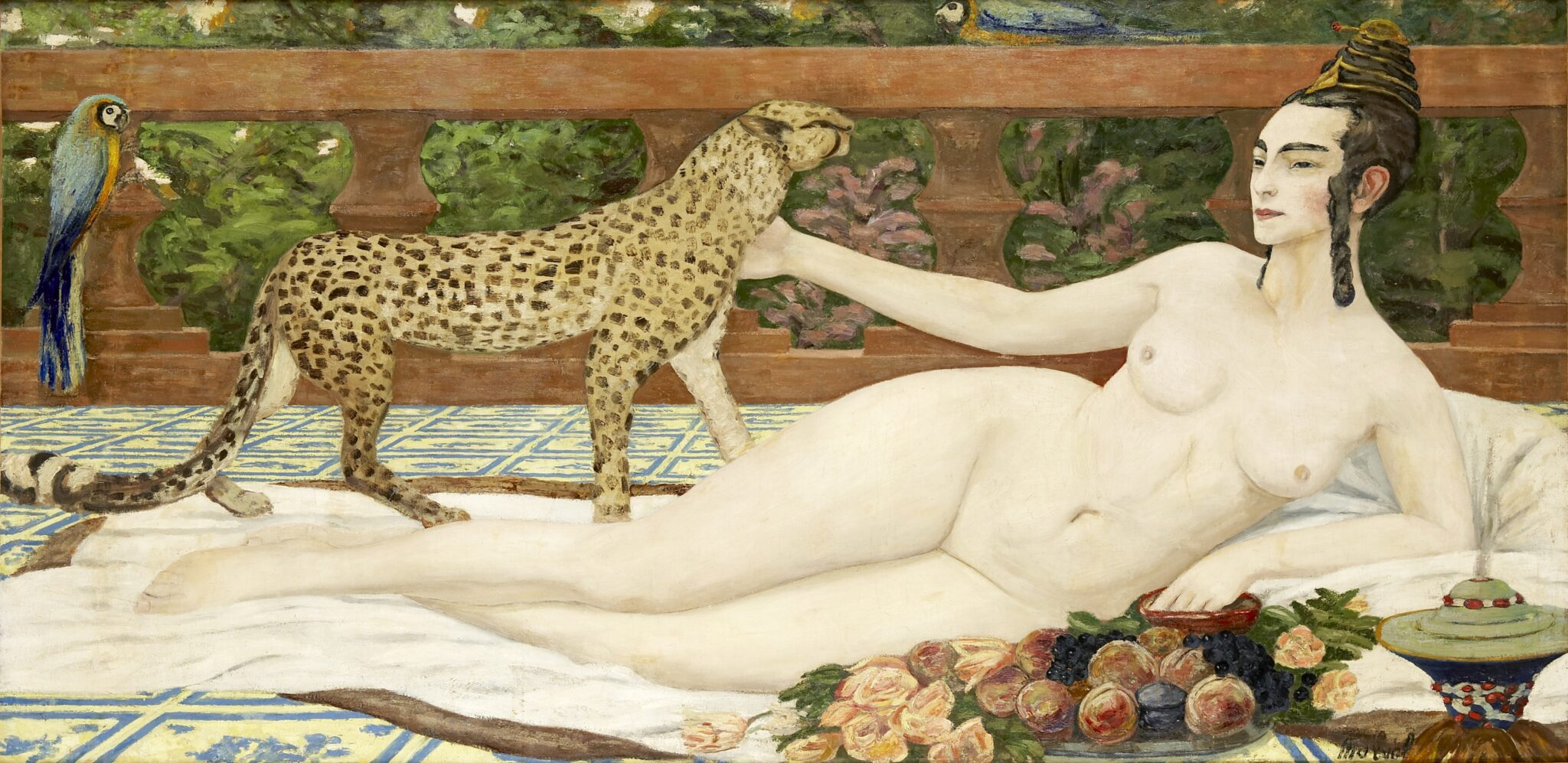
L'Odalisque au guépard (1900)

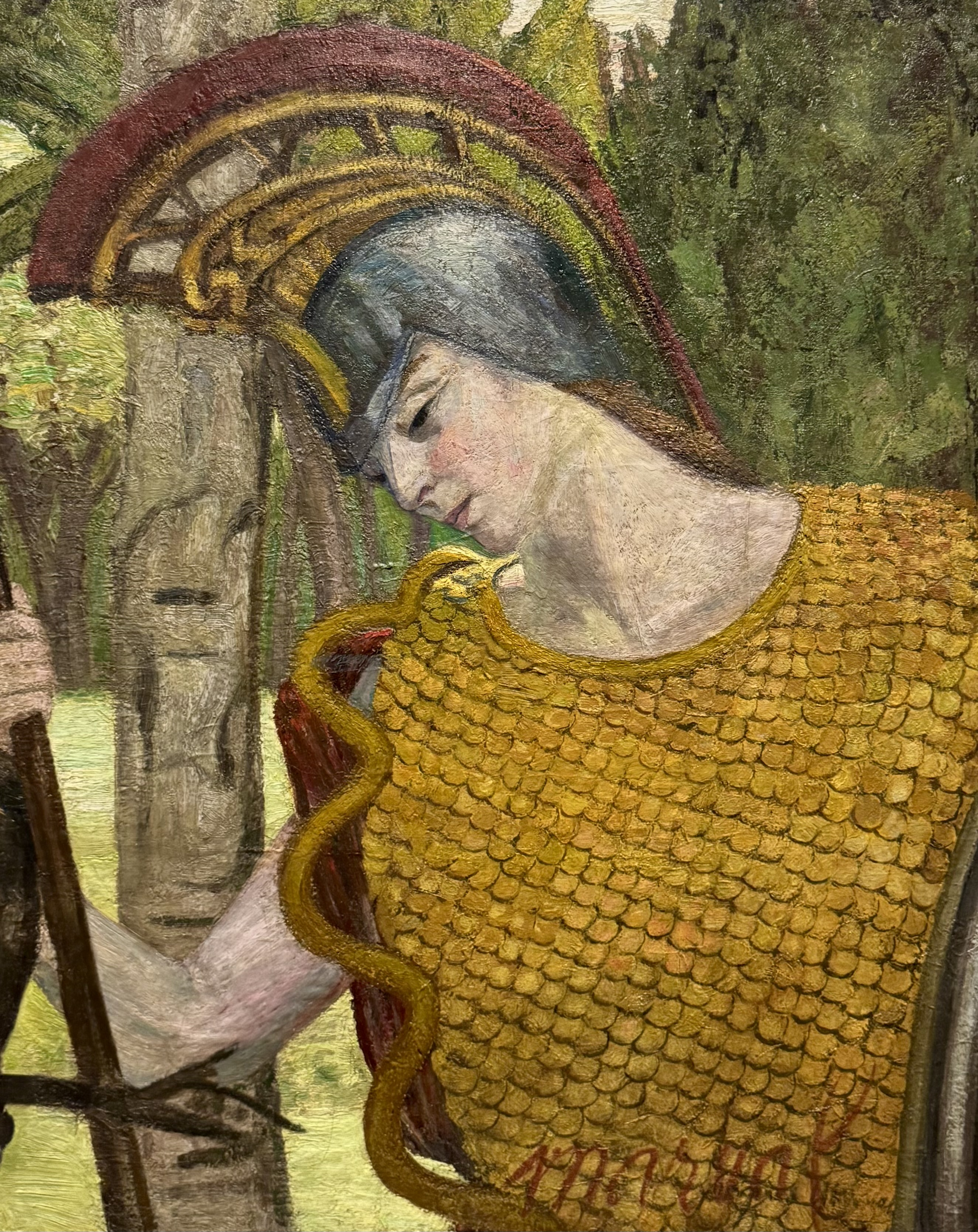
Minerva, (1900)

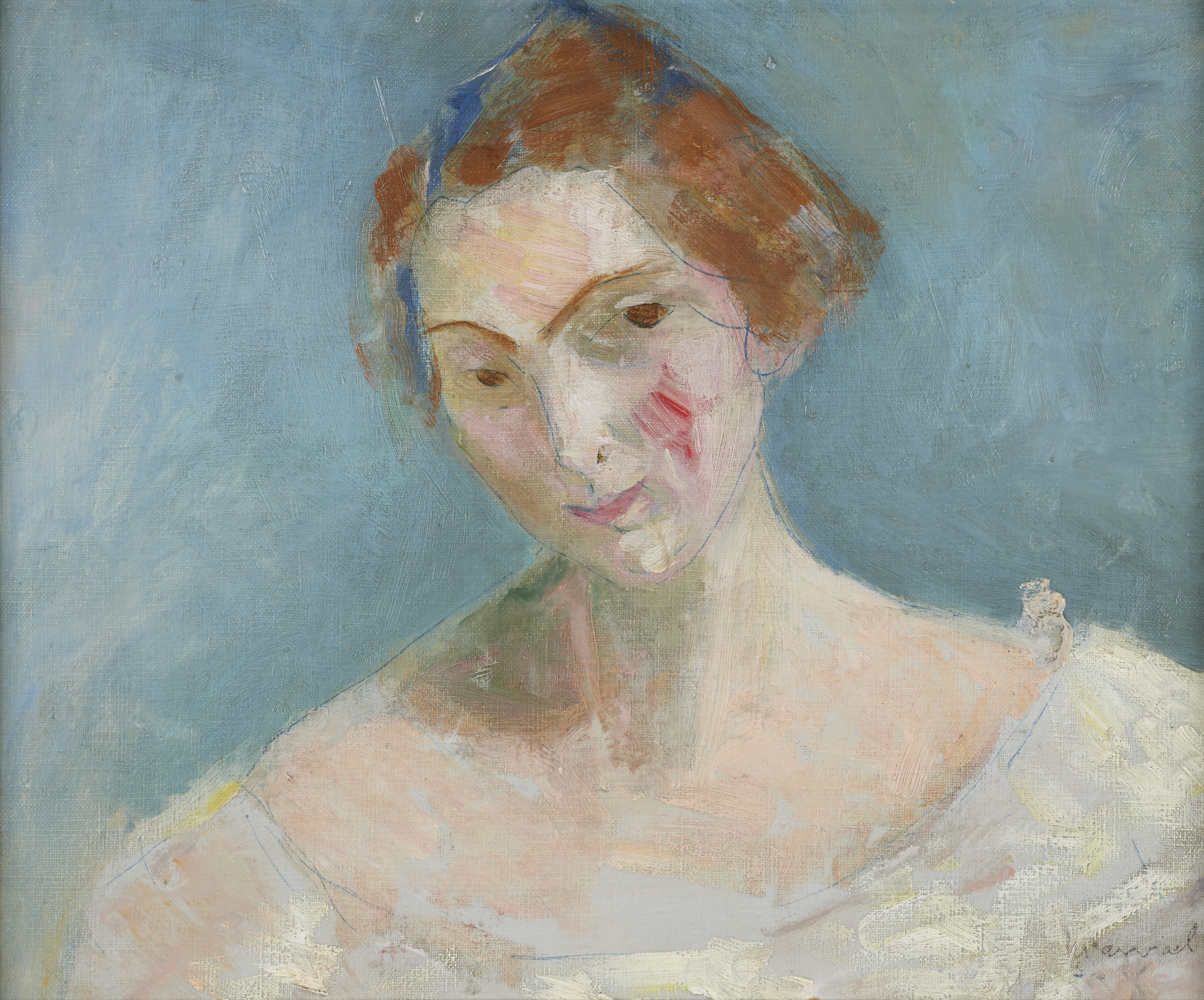
Self-portrait (1900)

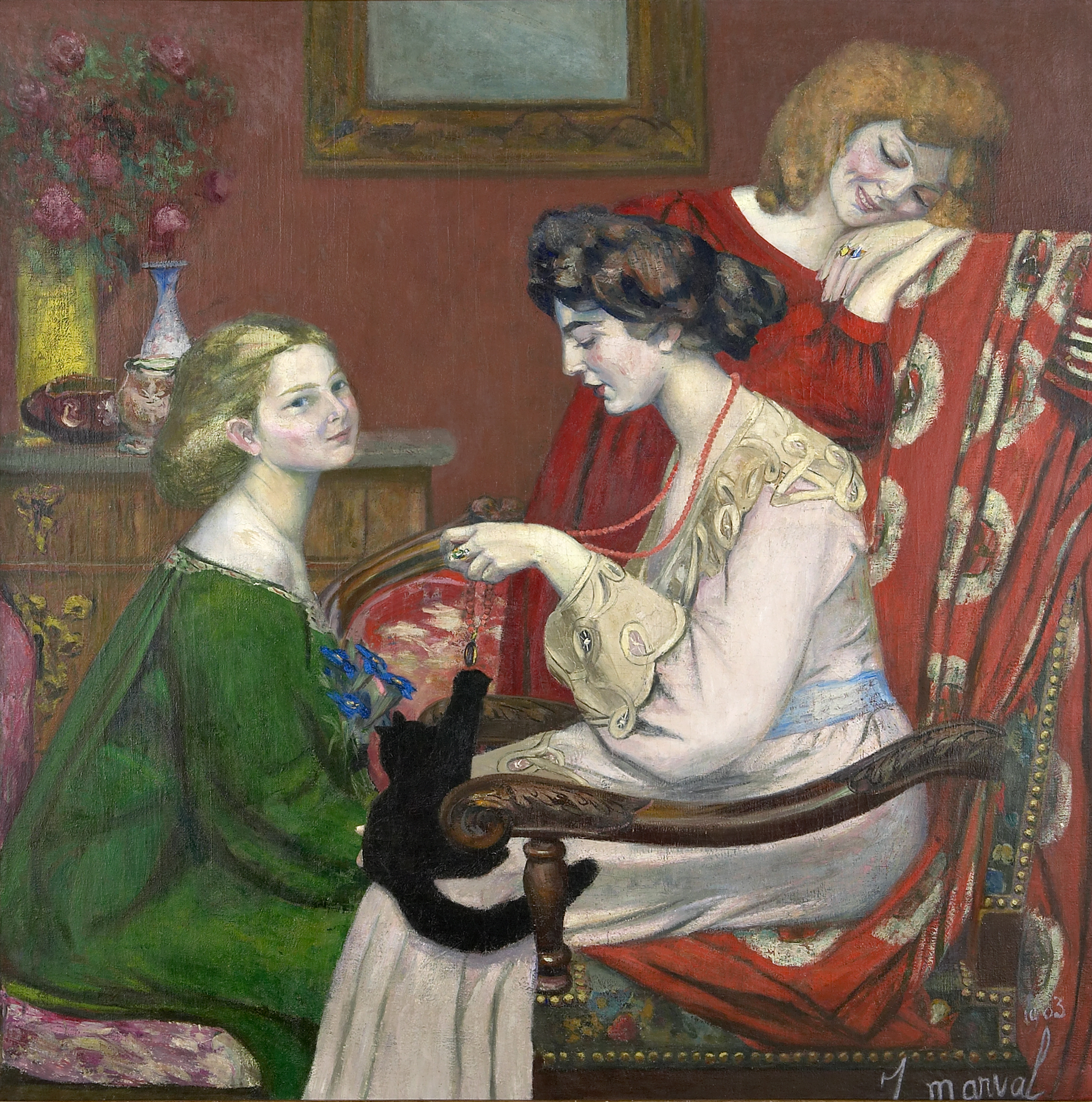
Les Coquettes (1903), oil on canvas, Ancienne Collection Ambroise Vollard

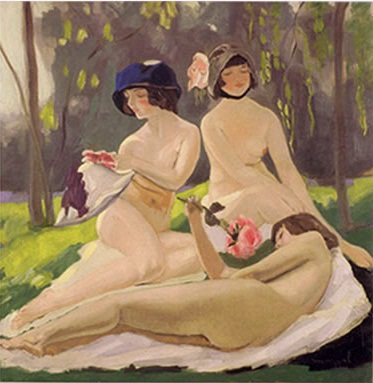
Les trois roses (1911)

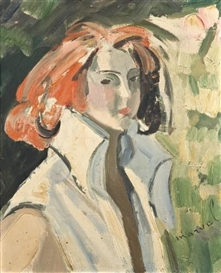
Portrait de femme (1912)

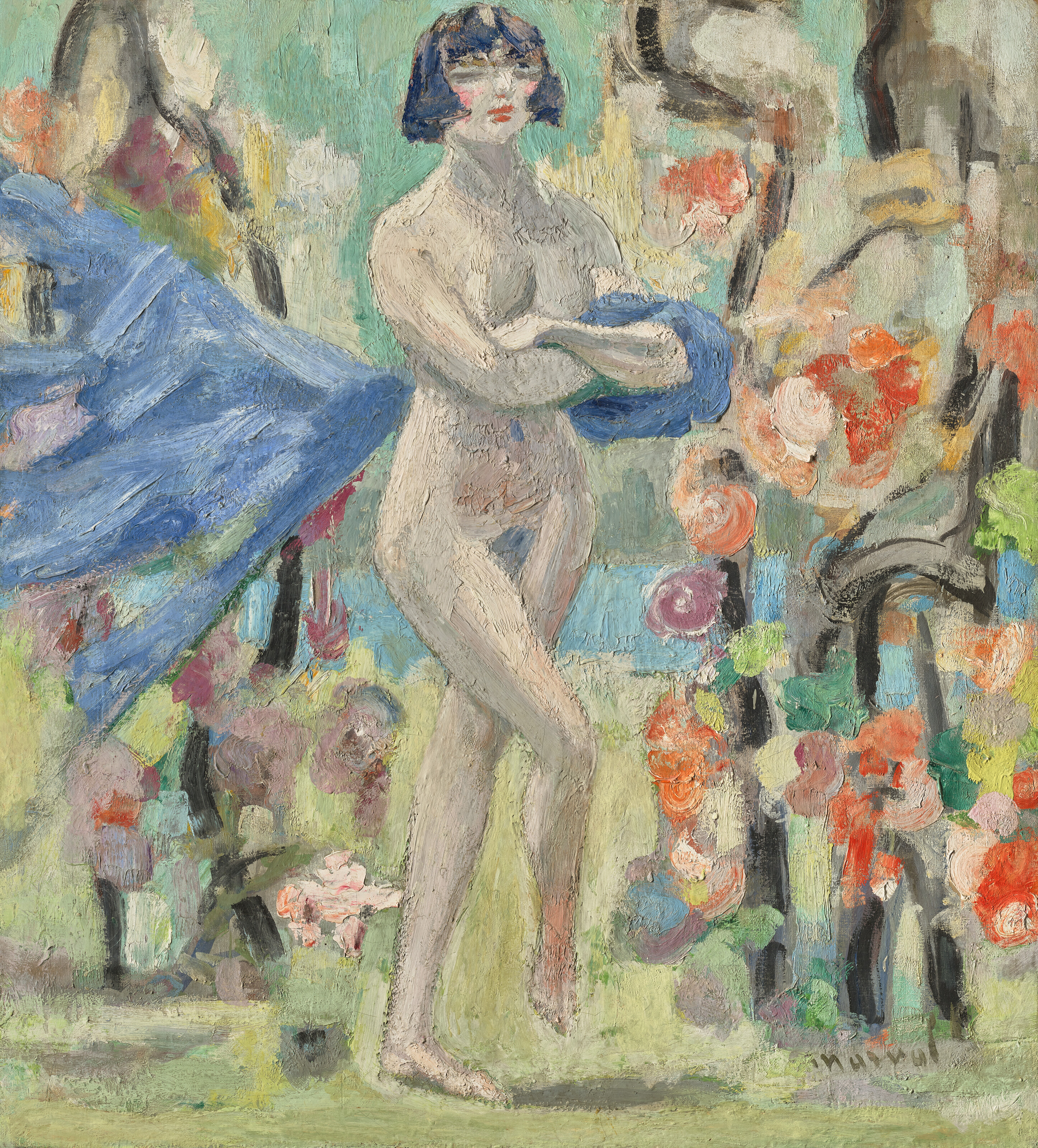
La bise d'automne (1914)

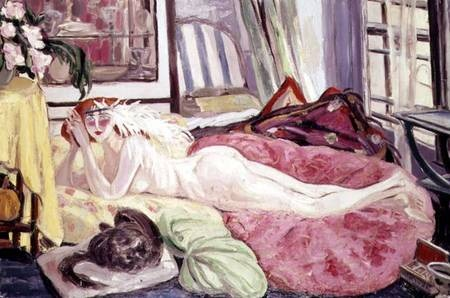
The Bohemian (1921)

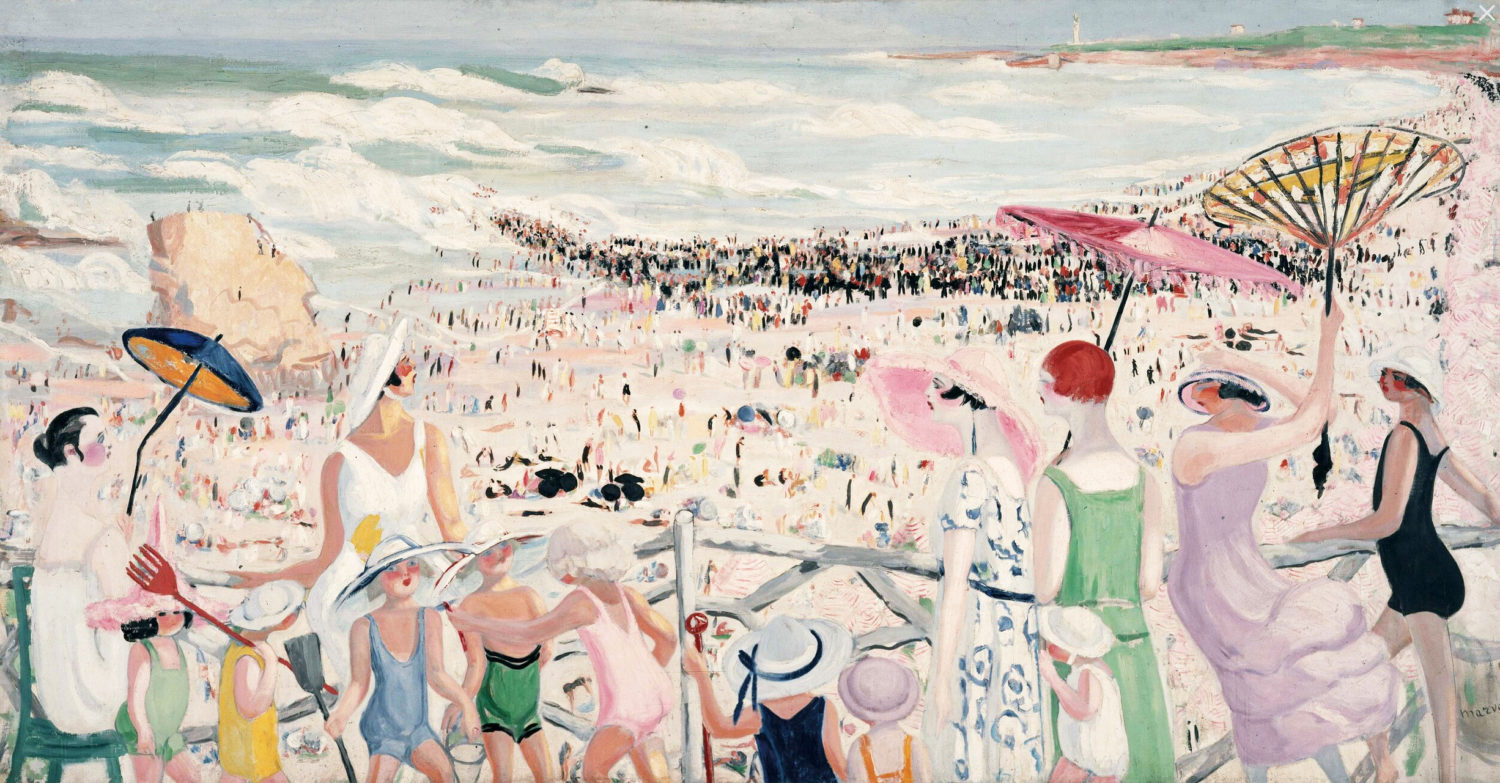
La grande plage à Biarritz (1923)
