= Misfortune Never Comes Alone =

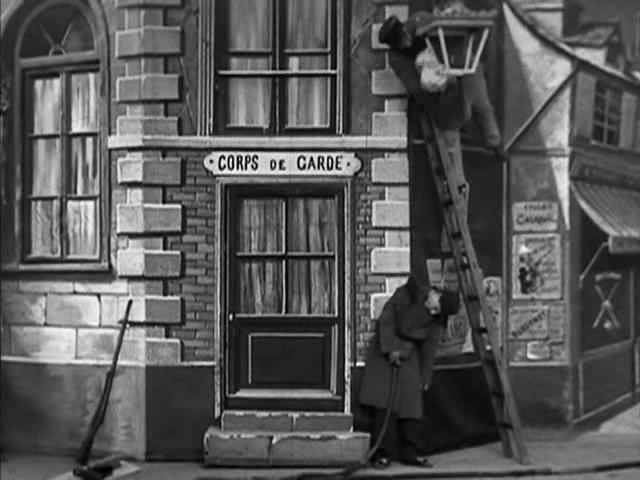
- A scene from the film
- Directed by: Georges Méliès
- Starring: Georges Méliès
- Production company: Star Film Company
- Release date: 1903
- Country: France
- Language: Silent

Misfortune Never Comes Alone (1903))

Un malheur n'arrive jamais seul, sold in the United States as Misfortune Never Comes Alone and in Britain as Accidents Never Happen Singly, is a 1903 French short silent film by Georges Méliès. It was sold by Méliès's Star Film Company and is numbered 451–452 in its catalogues.

Méliès plays the lamplighter in the film, which was made in the winter of 1902–03. The advertising column seen in the film includes two ads for Méliès himself, and one for Menier Chocolate. The film's special effects are created with substitution splices.
