= The Terrible Turkish Executioner =

- Directed by: Georges Méliès
- Starring: Georges Méliès
- Production company: Star Film Company
- Release date: 1903
- Country: France
- Language: Silent

Le Bourreau turc, sold in the United States as The Terrible Turkish Executioner, or It Served Him Right and in Britain as What Befell the Turkish Executioner, is a 1903 French silent trick film by Georges Méliès. It was sold by Méliès's Star Film Company and is numbered 534–535 in its catalogues.

Méliès himself plays the executioner in the film, one of several Méliès works involving disembodied heads. The special effects are created with substitution splices. The execution in the film emulates an effect popular for two centuries in magic lantern shows, in which severed heads or similar phenomena could be shown in motion using overlaid glass slides.

In a study of Méliès, Elizabeth Ezra notes that the film "exploits the stereotype of Oriental despotism and cruelty," with the prop heads giving "a visceral immediacy closer to Tarantino's lurid (though ironic) gore than to Méliès's standard dancing Disney-style body parts."
