= What Happened in the Tunnel =

- Directed by: Edwin S. Porter
- Starring: Bertha Regustus; Gilbert M. Anderson
- Cinematography: Edwin S. Porter
- Production companies: Edison Mfg. Co.; Kleine Optical Co.
- Distributed by: Edison Mfg. Co.; Kleine Optical Co.
- Release date: November 6, 1903
- Running time: 1 minute
- Country: United States
- Language: Silent

What Happened in the Tunnel is a 1903 silent short film starring Bertha Regustus and Gilbert M. Anderson. The film was directed and shot by Edwin S. Porter, produced by Edison Mfg. Co., and distributed by Edison Mfg. Co. and Kleine Optical Co.

== Plot ==
Full film

Inside a railroad car, a black maid sits next to a white woman. Behind both women sits a white man reading a newspaper. The woman drops her handkerchief. The man hands it back to her and starts to flirt with her. The train enters the tunnel and the film fades to black. As the train emerges from the tunnel, the two women have switched places and the man is kissing the black maid. The man looks around to see if anyone else saw and sits back down in embarrassment as the two women share a laugh over their prank.

== Cast ==
- Bertha Regustus as The black maid
- Gilbert M. Anderson as the white masher who snatches a kiss

== Reception ==
In the book, For the Love of Pleasure: Women, Movies, and Culture in Turn-of-the-century Chicago, the author describes how the film deals with "how widespread and exemplary is this syntactical employment of gendered, classed, and racial elements for the empowerment, not of a generalized but of a highly particular kind of female gaze."

== See also ==
- Edwin S. Porter filmography
- Broncho Billy Anderson
- African American cinema
- African American Women in the silent film era
