= The Infernal Cauldron =

Le Chaudron infernal
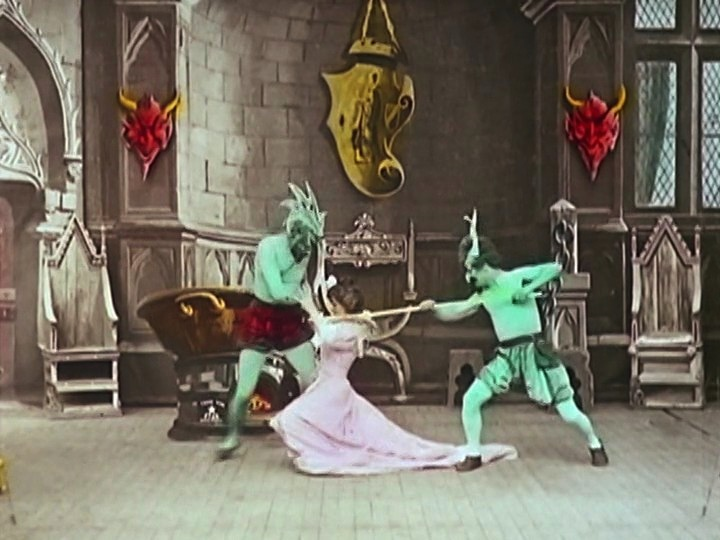
- Frame from the film
- Directed by: Georges Méliès
- Starring: Georges Méliès
- Distributed by: Star Film Company
- Release date: October 17, 1903
- Running time: 36 meters/116 feet (1–2 minutes)
- Country: France
- Language: Silent

Le Chaudron infernal, released in Britain as The Infernal Cauldron and in the United States as The Infernal Cauldron and the Phantasmal Vapors, is a 1903 French silent trick film directed by Georges Méliès. It was released by Méliès's Star Film Company and is numbered 499–500 in its catalogues.

== Plot ==
A hand-coloured print of the film

In a Renaissance chamber decorated with devilish faces and a warped coat of arms, a gleeful demon throws three human victims into a cauldron, which spews out flames with each sacrifice. The victims rise from the cauldron as nebulous ghosts, then turn into fireballs. The fireballs multiply and pursue the demon around the chamber. Finally, the demon himself leaps into the infernal cauldron, which gives off a final burst of flame.

== Production ==
Méliès plays the demon, identified in the Star Film Company's American catalogue as Belphegor. The film's special effects were created with pyrotechnics, multiple exposures, soft focus, and substitution splices.

== Versions ==
Méliès's pre-1903 films, especially the popular A Trip to the Moon, were frequently pirated by American producers such as Siegmund Lubin. In order to combat the piracy, Méliès opened an American branch of his Star Film Company and began producing two negatives of each film he made: one for domestic markets, and one for foreign release. To produce the two separate negatives, Méliès built a special camera that used two lenses and two reels of film simultaneously.

In the 2000s, researchers at the French film company Lobster Films noticed that Méliès's two-lens system was in effect an unintentional, but fully functional, stereo film camera, and therefore that 3D versions of Méliès films could be made simply by combining the domestic and foreign prints of the film. Serge Bromberg, the founder of Lobster Films, presented 3D versions of The Infernal Cauldron and another 1903 Méliès film, The Oracle of Delphi, at a January 2010 presentation at the Cinémathèque Française. According to the film critic Kristin Thompson, "the effect of 3D was delightful … the films as synchronized by Lobster looked exactly as if Méliès had designed them for 3D." Bromberg screened both films again—as well as the 1906 Méliès film The Mysterious Retort, similarly prepared for 3D—at a September 2011 presentation at the Academy of Motion Picture Arts and Sciences.
