= The Monster (1903 film) =

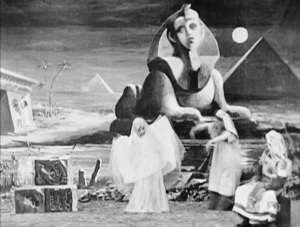
- Directed by: Georges Méliès
- Starring: Georges Méliès
- Production company: Star Film Company
- Release date: June 30, 1903 (US)
- Running time: 50 meters (approx. 2 minutes)
- Country: France
- Language: Silent

The Monster (French: Le Monstre) is a 1903 French silent trick film directed by Georges Méliès.

== Plot ==
The Monster (1903)

An Egyptian prince hires a priest to resurrect his dead wife. The priest recovers the wife's skeleton from a tomb and says a prayer over it. The skeleton takes on life and begins to dance. The priest wraps the skeleton in cloth, creating a shrouded monster which dances manically and grows rapidly. The priest says another prayer, and the monster shrinks back to normal size and transforms into the prince's wife. The priest wraps another shroud around the princess and throws her to the prince. When the cloth is unwound, all that remains is the skeleton.

== Production ==
Méliès appears in the film as the priest. The special effects were created with stage machinery (including trapdoors), substitution splices, and superimpositions; the dancing skeleton was a marionette controlled by wires.

== Themes ==
The plot of The Monster is an exact inversion of one of Méliès's major earlier films, The Vanishing Lady. In the earlier film, a living woman becomes a skeleton before turning back to her living form; in the later film, a skeleton temporarily becomes a living woman. Both films are examples of the memento mori theme in art. The Monster is also reminiscent of horror films, but was made before horror was established as a film genre.

The film's production design evokes Egyptomania, the nineteenth-century rediscovery of Ancient Egyptian arts and culture. The Monster, like the stylistically similar 1901 British film The Haunted Curiosity Shop, drew heavily on Western conceptions of Ancient Egypt for design elements as well as for a sense of ancient ritualism and occultism. The film is not a narrative-centered work, but rather a trick film in which the Ancient Egyptian elements, filtered through a long tradition of representation and popularity in Western culture, contribute to the sense of magic.

== Release ==
The Monster was released by Méliès's Star Film Company and is numbered 481–482 in its catalogs. On 30 June 1903, it was deposited at the Library of Congress for American copyright. In Méliès's American catalogs, the Egyptian priest was misidentified as a dervish.
