= The Living Playing Cards =

- Directed by: Georges Méliès
- Starring: Georges Méliès
- Production company: Star Film Company
- Release date: 1905
- Running time: 2.6 minutes at 16fps
- Country: France
- Language: Silent

The Living Playing Cards (French: Les Cartes vivantes) is a 1905 French silent trick film directed by Georges Méliès.

== Synopsis ==
A magician enters a stage set on which a large white screen has been placed. Taking a deck of playing cards, he shows one to the camera, makes it grow larger, and finally throws it upon the screen, creating a gigantic reproduction of the card. He does the same with two face cards, a queen and king, each of which comes to life and steps out of the card. The king chases the magician off the stage, before ripping off his disguise to reveal the magician himself.

== Production ==
The film is based on a stage magic act performed at Méliès's theatre of illusions, the Théâtre Robert-Houdin in Paris. In the stage version, the magician was Gaston Velle, who would himself later become a director of Méliès-like trick films for Pathé Frères. In the film version, Méliès himself plays the magician. The special effects used are substitution splices and dissolves.
