= The Gay Shoe Clerk =

1903 film by Edwin S. Porter

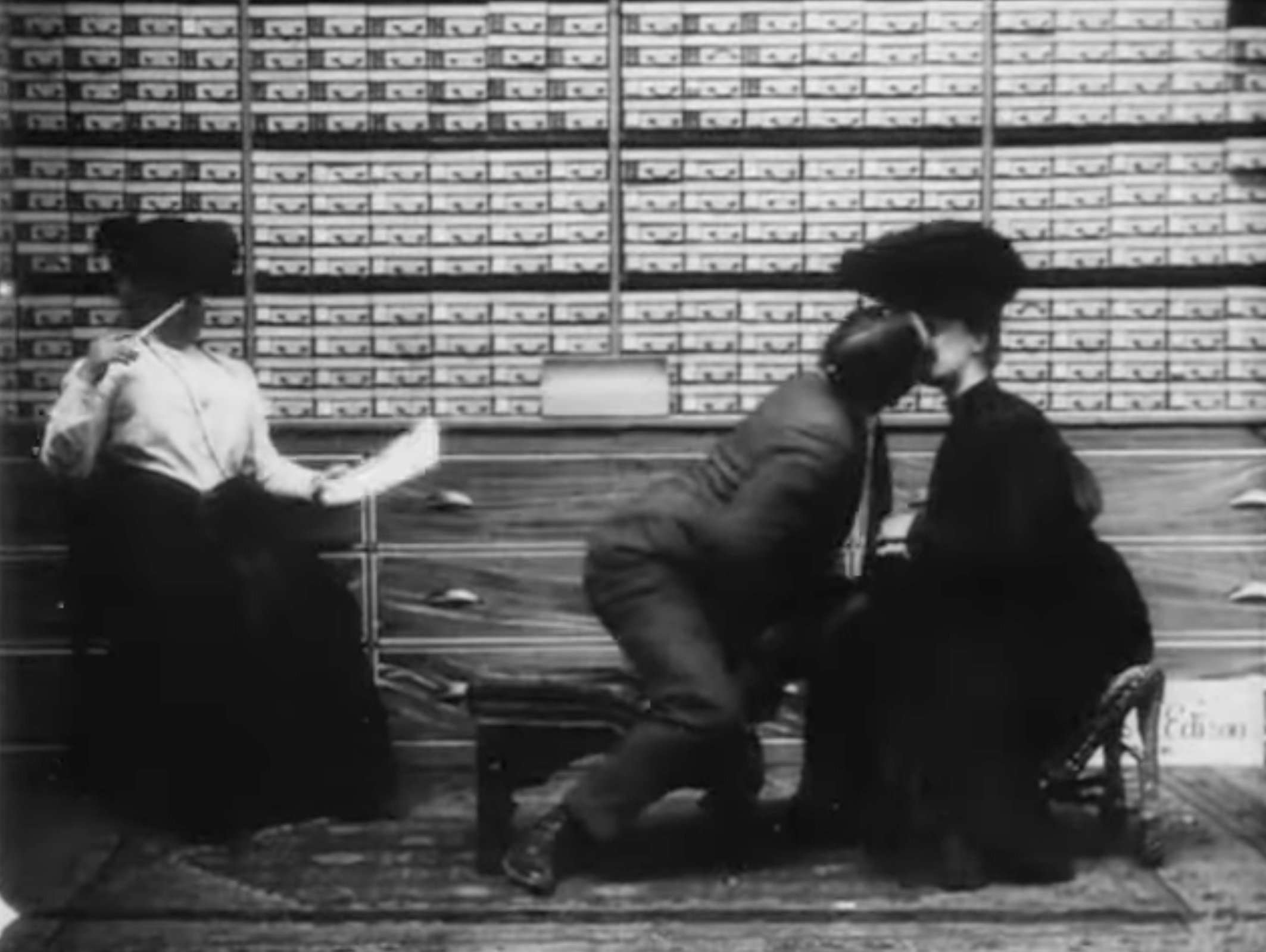
- Directed by: Edwin S. Porter
- Distributed by: Edison Manufacturing Company
- Release date: August 12, 1903
- Running time: 1:15
- Country: United States
- Language: English

The Gay Shoe Clerk is a 1903 silent short film directed by Edwin S. Porter. The film depicts a risqué comic encounter between a clerk and his female customer while she is trying on shoes.

== Plot ==
The Gay Shoe Clerk (1903)

In the film, a young woman enters the shoe store, accompanied by an elderly companion. While the older woman settles down in a chair to read, the young customer sits in the shoe demonstration chair and raises her foot. The customer selects a high-heeled slipper, and the eager clerk removes her shoe, and puts on the new shoe. The shot changes to a close-up of the young woman's ankle as the clerk ties her laces. The woman's skirt rises slowly, revealing her ankle and her leg. The camera returns to a wide shot, and we see the clerk lean in to kiss the customer, which she happily returns. Seeing their embrace, the elderly woman stands up, and beats the clerk over the head with her umbrella. The film ends as the clerk flees, and the old woman ushers the young woman out of the store.

== Production ==
The structure of the short builds on the example of two other films: Biograph's No Liberties, Please (1902), which similarly featured a young man being punished for his fresh behavior in a public place, and George Albert Smith's As Seen Through a Telescope (1900), which used an insert shot to represent what one of the characters can see.

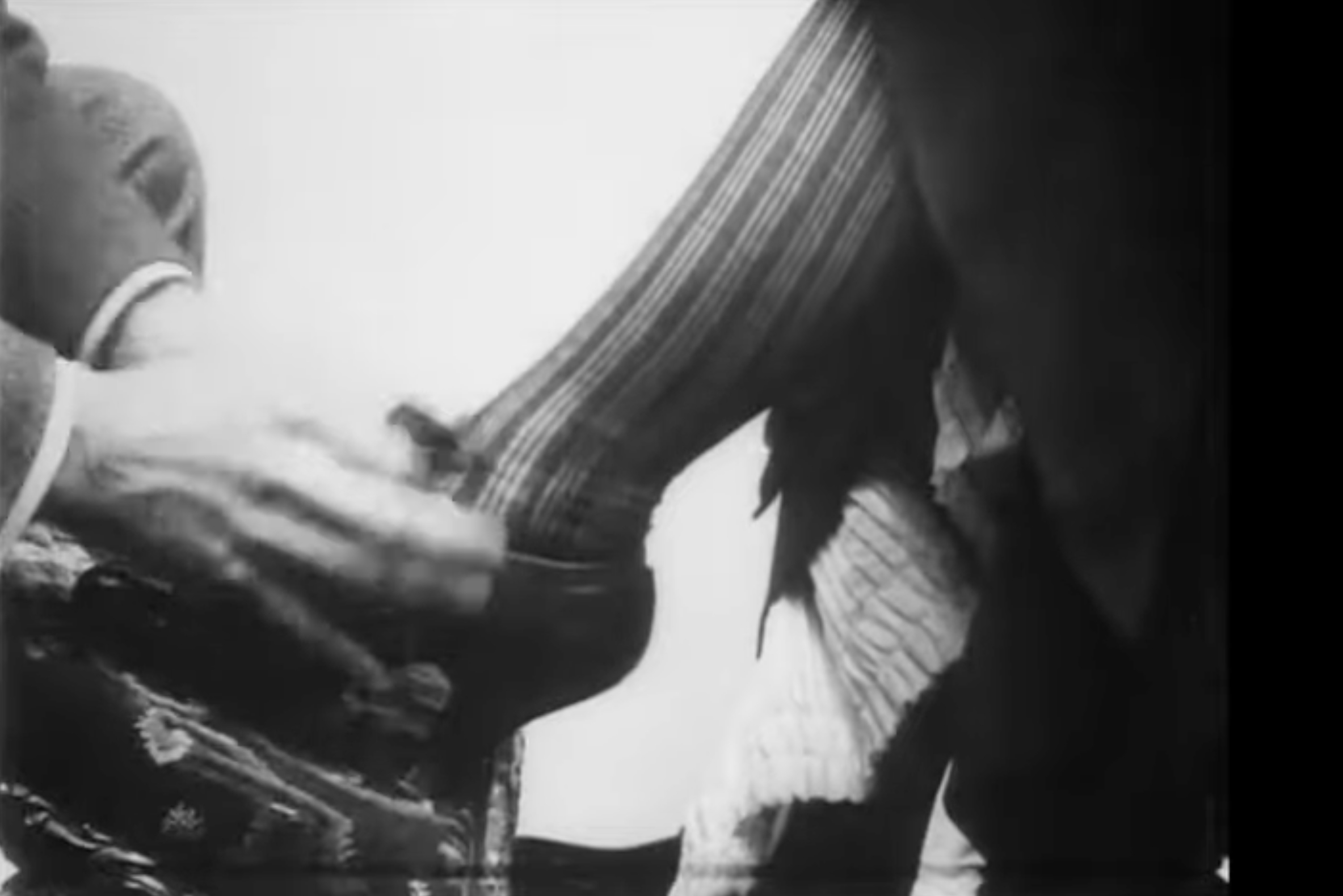
The close-up of the customer's ankle.

While the insert shot draws the audience's attention to the customer's shapely ankle, it does not represent what the shoe clerk sees. It's shot from the side, preserving the point of view of the theater audience.

== Reception ==
Film historian Charles Musser observes that the film validates the male gaze: "True, the young man not only sees but touches and even kisses the young lady, but his transgression is promptly greeted by a bash on the head from the chaperone. Meanwhile, the male spectator enjoys the woman's ankle and the shoe clerk's chastisement... Cinema, by removing the spectator's physical presence from the scene, allows the (male) viewer to take pleasure in what is otherwise forbidden."

Critic Tom Pollard says, "The film's seemingly innocuous format prevented local censors from doing much damage, yet it evoked sexuality... [This and similar films] evoke Victorian-era taboos while revealing the limits of permissible filmmaking at the time. They reveal a society deep in the throes of social conflict over the limits of sexuality."

== See also ==
- Edwin S. Porter filmography
