= The Apparition (1903 film) =

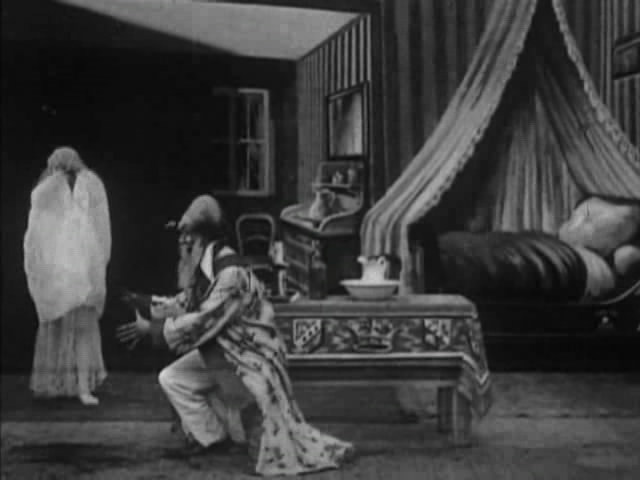
- A scene from the film
- Directed by: Georges Méliès
- Starring: Georges Méliès
- Production company: Star Film Company
- Release date: 1903
- Country: France
- Language: Silent

The Apparition, or Mr. Jones' Comical Experience With a Ghost (French: Le Revenant), also known as The Ghost and the Candle and as Apparitions, is a 1903 French silent trick film by Georges Méliès.

== Plot ==
The Apparition (1903)

An elderly traveler arrives at an inn. After making a pass at the hotel maid, he sits down and attempts to read by candlelight. To his astonishment, the candle refuses to cooperate, moving around the table and then growing to incredible height. Finally it moves so close that the newspaper catches fire.

From the fire comes an apparition of a woman, with whom the traveler is fascinated. As he kneels to court her, she changes into a grotesque, shrouded ghost, who dances in a blurry haze and walks right through the enraged traveler. The traveler tries to attack the ghost, but only manages to shatter his dinner tray, to the amusement of the hotel staff.

== Production ==
Méliès plays the traveler in the film, which achieves its special effects with a combination of pyrotechnics, soft focus, multiple exposures, and substitution splices.

== Release ==
Le Revenant was sold by Méliès's Star Film Company and is numbered 501–502 in its catalogues. It was sold in the United States as The Apparition, or Mr. Jones' Comical Experience With a Ghost and in Britain as The Ghost and the Candle; a 2008 video release used the title Apparitions.
