= The Oracle of Delphi (film) =

L'Oracle de Delphes
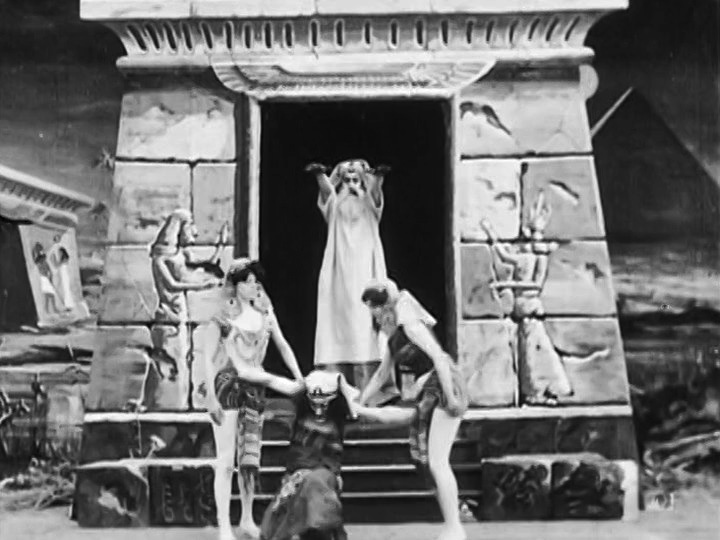
- Frame from the film
- Directed by: Georges Méliès
- Produced by: Georges Méliès
- Distributed by: Star Film Company
- Release date: 1903
- Running time: 30 meters/100 feet
- Country: France
- Language: Silent

The Oracle of Delphi (French: L'Oracle de Delphes) is a 1903 French silent trick film directed by Georges Méliès. It was released by Méliès's Star Film Company and is numbered 476 in its catalogues.

== Plot ==
The Oracle of Delphi (1903)

In ancient Egypt, two priests deposit an ornate box inside a temple, locking the doors behind them. After their departure, a thief breaks into the temple and steals the box, but he is caught by a mysteriously appearing bearded figure. The bearded man retrieves the box and gives life to the two sphinx statues placed at the doors. The sphinxes appear as living women and attack the thief, whose head turns immediately into a donkey's head. The sphinxes turn back into statues, the bearded man disappears, and the donkey-thief is left sitting astonished on the ground.

== Production ==
Méliès plays the thief in the film. Though the title refers to the Oracle of Delphi, a high priestess in Ancient Greek religion, the sets and costumes instead indicate an Ancient Egyptian setting. The palanquin and box props, in turn, were later reused for still another setting, the eclectic Orientalism of Méliès's film The Palace of the Arabian Nights (1905). The special effects techniques in the film include substitution splices as well as dissolving multiple exposures.

== Versions ==
Méliès's pre-1903 films, especially the popular A Trip to the Moon, were frequently pirated by American producers such as Siegmund Lubin. In order to combat the piracy, Méliès opened an American branch of his Star Film Company and began producing two negatives of each film he made: one for domestic markets, and one for foreign release. To produce the two separate negatives, Méliès built a special camera that used two lenses and two reels of film simultaneously.

In the 2000s, researchers at the French film company Lobster Films noticed that Méliès's two-lens system was in effect an unintentional, but fully functional, stereo film camera, and therefore that 3D versions of Méliès films could be made simply by combining the domestic and foreign prints of the film. Serge Bromberg, the founder of Lobster Films, presented 3D versions of The Oracle of Delphi and another 1903 Méliès film, The Infernal Cauldron, at a January 2010 presentation at the Cinémathèque Française. According to the film critic Kristin Thompson, "the effect of 3D was delightful … the films as synchronized by Lobster looked exactly as if Méliès had designed them for 3D." Bromberg screened both films again—as well as the 1906 Méliès film The Mysterious Retort, similarly prepared for 3D—at a September 2011 presentation at the Academy of Motion Picture Arts and Sciences.
