= The Witch's Revenge =

1903 film by Georges Méliès

- Directed by: Georges Méliès
- Production company: Star Film Company
- Release date: 1903
- Country: France
- Language: Silent

Le Sorcier, sold in the United States as The Witch's Revenge and in Britain as The Sorcerer's Revenge, is a 1903 French silent trick film by Georges Méliès. It was sold by Méliès's Star Film Company and is numbered 473–475 in its catalogues.

== Plot ==
A surviving print of the film

In a courtly setting, a king condemns an old sorcerer to be chained to a post and tortured. The sorcerer, begging for mercy, attempts to entertain the court with magic, conjuring up a classical tableau vivant and making a chair spin of its own accord. However, the king is steadfast. Just as he is about to chain up the sorcerer, however, his attendants transform into assistants of the sorcerer, and chain the king up instead. The sorcerer and the whole court link arms, and they all dance away happily.

== Production ==
Méliès plays the sorcerer, whose magic is created using a combination of stage machinery, trap doors, substitution splices, multiple exposures, and dissolves.
