= Alf Collins =

British actor (1866–1951)

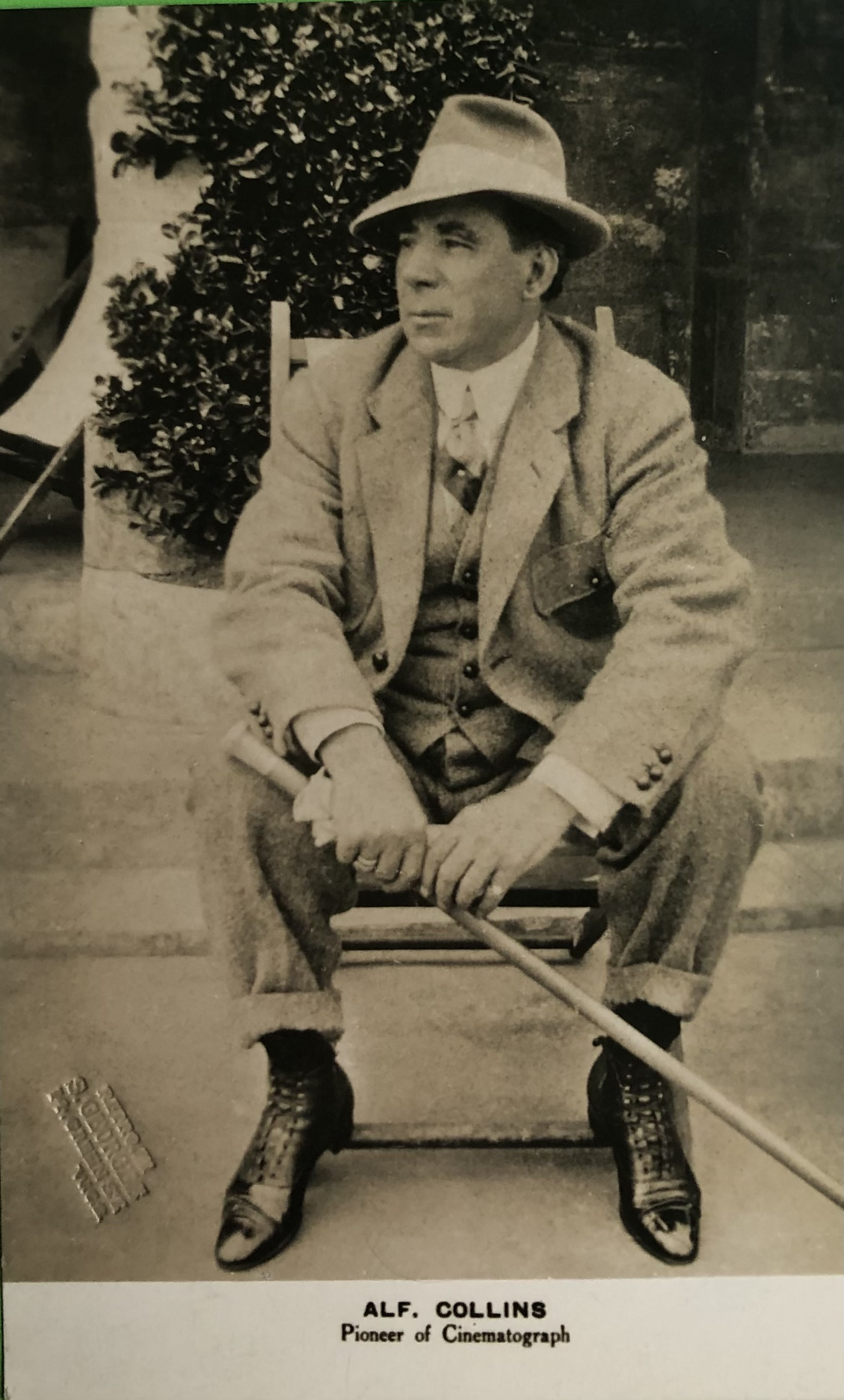
Alf Collins pioneer of cinematograph

Alfred Collins (Walworth, 19 June 1866 – 20 December 1951 Clapham) was a British theatre actor who later became a silent film director and actor. His shorts include Rescued by Lifeboat (1906), The Lady Athlete; or, Jiu-Jitsu Downs the Footpads (1907), and The Dancing Girl (1908). Early films were produced with nitrate film and deteriorated in their storage tins, sometimes catching fire, so most of them are lost.

There survives approximately 45 films that have been found so far that Collins either acted in or produced, including fourteen rare Edwardian films screened in 2014 at an event called Gaumont Comes Home. This event was held on the original site of Collins's outdoor stage, of the Gaumont film studios, in Camberwell. The event included the film When Extremes Meet (1905), which is 150 feet long, with Collins dressed in Cockney costume. How Percy Won the Beauty Competition (1909) is a comic chase film set in the fields and nearby streets of his outdoor stage.

Between 1904 and 1908, Gaumont also produced a number of sound-disc films known as "Chronophones". One of these – It Was A Nice Quiet Morning (1907) – has survived and has now been synchronised with an original recording provided by local film collector Bob Geoghegan. This appears to be the only surviving British talking film made prior to World War I.

Early films were either copied or the ideas used by showmen or other film companies, so copyright was introduced. Some of these films only exist today because they were copyrighted between 1895 to 1912 with the Library of Congress in Washington, D.C., or with The National Archives in Kew, London. The National Archives used a single photograph of a scene from the film to copyright and in the Library of Congress the whole film was copied onto photographic paper to copyright. These are known as paper prints. In 1952 they started to convert paper prints to 16 mm film. Several of Collins's films were paper prints and restored, for example, The Pickpocket (1903) 300 feet long and The Costers Wedding (1904) 250 feet long.

== Early theatre and music hall career ==
Collins was the eldest son of a cockney costermonger and Collins's two brothers and two sisters all tread the boards of theatres and music halls. Collins's brother Charles Collins composed music hall songs still known today, including Any Old Iron and Boiled Beef & Carrots sung by Harry Champion and Don’t Dilly Dally on the Way’ sung by Marie Lloyd and It’s No Use You Calling Hannah! sung by Kate Carney and George Collins his brother.

Collins started his theatre career at The Surrey Theatre under George Conquest as a super, the term for a non-speaking member of the crowd. Collins was then engaged at the Lyceum Theatre as a Super under the management of Henry Irving who realised Collins potential and engaged Collins as Super Master, controlling entrances, exits and general moves and behaviour of the crowd.

Collins moved to the Adelphi Theatre as a Super Master for nine years with William Terriss, until Terriss was murdered at the stage door in 1897.

Collins worked for several theatres at the same time and in 1902 Henry Irving wanted him to tour America with him. However, ‘Queen of the Coster Song' Kate Carney wanted him to appear in sketches and stage manage her productions. Collins decided to join Kate Carney an engagement that lasted 30 years.

At the same time Collins continued to work in other theatres, in the 1903 pantomime he played the Policeman in Harlequinade with Dan Leno at the Drury Lane Theatre.

== Cinematography career ==
At the same time as Collins's theatre work, he started to act for Robert W. Paul's cinematograph company. Collins acted in several films including the 1901 comedy trick film An Over-Incubated Baby.

For the British Mutoscope and Biograph Company Collins made an early convict short film for them What Goes on in the Moonlight, to use in their penny-in-the-slot machines and for music halls.

From 1902 to 1910 Colonel A.C. Bromhead engaged him to produce films for the Gaumont-British Company. Collins went on to produce and sometimes act in over 260 films for Gaumont-British and used his out of work theatre friends and his own family as actors. These short films interior shots were filmed on an outdoor 30 feet by 15 feet wooden stage with changeable flats. Exterior shots filmed in the surrounding streets and if the location was suitable, shot on location where Collins was performing with Kate Carney. Bromhead would send by train a camera man and camera and the film was usually shot in a day. One of these films was a film shot at Brighton, about a bathing belle and a flirty husband, called Mixed Bathing (1904) 250 feet long.

Collins became popular for his chase films in which he used his broad theatre and pantomime experiences, whilst using his cockney knowledge to make realistic comedy films on everyday life. For example, The Runaway Match or Marriage By Motor (1903) 290 feet long, an elopement story where a father in his car chases a young couple in their car to the church. Collins invented a trick in this film, for filming in two sections, firstly the car of the pursued couple and then the pursuing father in his car.

Collins also produced classic films, the 1906 film the Curfew Must Not Ring Tonight had eight scenes and 730 feet long, based on a poem by Rose.H.Thorpe.

== Later theatre career ==
The Gaumont Company started to import foreign films and by 1910 were concentrating more on its hiring and equipment side and less on making films. Gaumont used elaborate plots and longer films. Collins was offered a role as an ideas man to these new Gaumont producers, however realising that the film world was changing, Collins chose to stay with Kate Carney.

Collins continued to do theatre work and act in films for example It Is For England (1916) produced by Laurence Cowen acting as Rosenbaum’s private secretary.

In 1916 Collins plays the Captain and Kate Carney stars as Liza at the Empire, Bristol in I Should Say So.

As late as 1935 Collins produced ‘Babes In The Wood’ at the Shakespeare in Liverpool. The Stage Archive quoted "Good wholesome fun and hilarious slapstick are abundant, the chorus is admirably trained and finished."

== Selected filmography ==
- Robert W. Paul – An Over-Incubated Baby (1901) 80 feet (or 1 minute 20 seconds)
- British Mutoscope & Biograph Co – What Goes On In The Moonlight
- Gaumont – Clown, Pantaloon and Bobby (1902) 190 feet
- Robert W. Paul – A Chess Dispute (1903) 80 feet
- Robert W. Paul – Pocket Boxers (1903) 80 feet
- Gaumont Co – Dotheboys Hall or Nicholas Nickleby (1903) 225 feet, Paper Print
- Gaumont Co – The Pickpocket (1903) 300 feet, Paper Print
- Gaumont Co – The Runaway Match, or Marriage By Motor (1903) 290 feet
- Gaumont Co – The Apple Woman (1904) 120 feet, Paper Print
- Gaumont Co – The Coster's Wedding (1904) 250 feet, Paper Print
- Gaumont Co – Mixed Bathing (1904) 250 feet, Paper Print
- Gaumont — Raid on a Coiner's Den (1905)
- Gaumont Co – When Extremes Meet (1905) 150 feet
- Gaumont Co -Clarendon – That Awful Baby(1905) 500 feet
- Gaumont Co – Curfew Must Not Ring Tonight (1906) 730 feet
- Gaumont Co – It's Not My Parcel (1906) 216 feet*
- Gaumont Chronophone – It Was A Nice Quiet Morning (1907)
- Gaumont Chronophone – Won't You Throw Me A Kiss (1907)
- Gaumont Co – Ju-Jitsu (1907) 445 feet
- Gaumont Co – Jane Shore (1908) 695 feet
- Gaumont Co – Harry Lauder In A Hurry (1908) 325 feet
- Gaumont Co – The Dancing Girl (1908) 598 feet
- Gaumont Co – Napoleon And the English Sailor (1908) 530 feet
- Gaumont Co – How Percy Won The Beauty Competition (1909) 423 feet
- Gaumont Co – The Sleep Breakers or Off Duty (1910) 450 feet
- Gaumont Co – Winning A Widdow (1910) 720 feet
- Terrier Film Cooperative – A Maid Of The Alps 1330 feet
- Union Jack – It Is for England (1916) 10,000 feet
