= Chess (poem) =

Poem by Jan Kochanowski

- by Jan Kochanowski
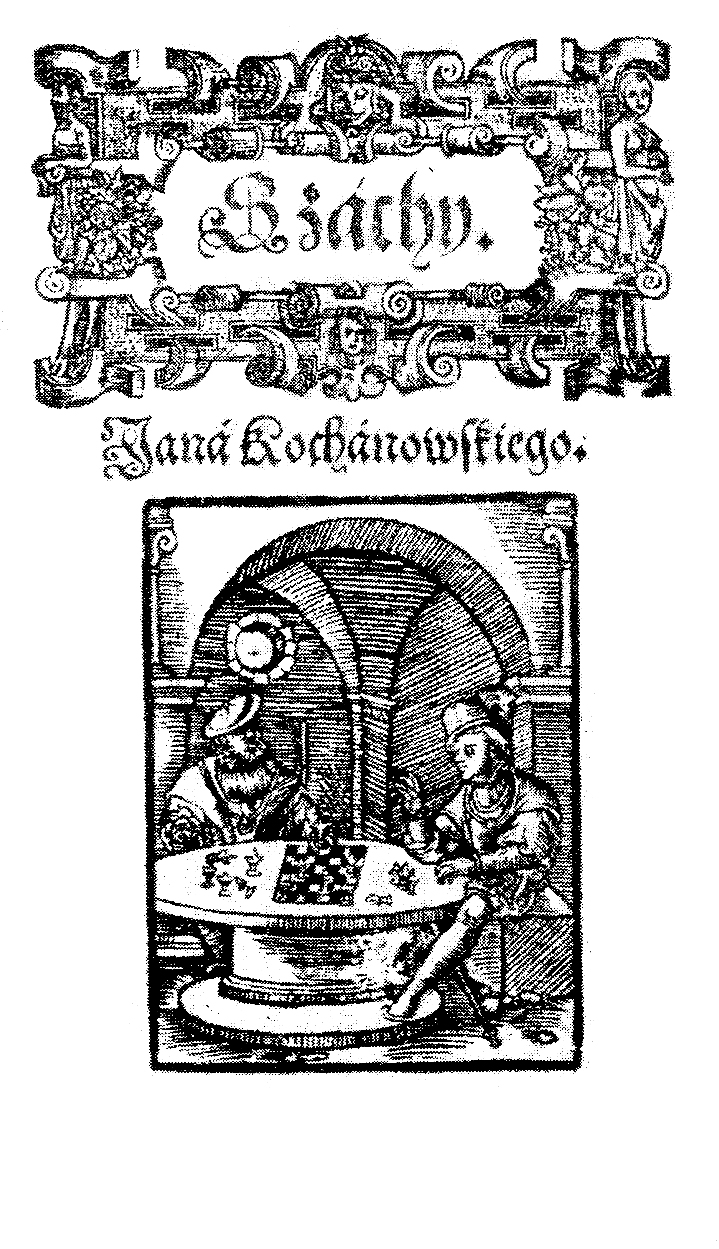
- Front page of the 1585 edition
- Original title: Szachy
- Country: Polish–Lithuanian Commonwealth
- Language: Polish
- Subject: Chess
- Publication date: c. 1565

Chess (Polish: Szachy) is a poem written by Jan Kochanowski, first published in 1564 or 1565. Inspired by Marco Girolamo Vida's Scacchia Ludus, it is a narrative poetry work that describes a game of chess between two men, Fiedor and Borzuj, who fight for the right to marry Anna, princess of Denmark. The poem anthropomorphises the pieces, presenting the game as a battle between two armies, in a style reminiscent of battle scenes in the works of Homer and Virgil.

In 1912, Alexander Wagner reconstructed the game described in the poem, while Yuri Averbakh found that it has three possible endings in 1967.

== Background ==
During his visit to the Italian lands in 1558–59, Jan Kochanowski encountered Scacchia Ludus, a poem by Marco Girolamo Vida, which describes a game of chess played on Mount Olympus between Apollo and Mercury. It is possible that Kochanowski also met Vida himself. Inspired by Scacchia Ludus, Kochanowski decided to create his own poem with a chess game as the main topic.

Until the second half of the 19th century, Chess was often thought to be only a paraphrase of Vida's poem, rather than an independent work. In his 1856 essay Chess in Poland (Polish: Szachy w Polszcze), historian Maurycy Dzieduszycki proved that Kochanowski's poem, while inspired by Scacchia Ludus, is dependent on it only to a small extent and should be considered a fully separate work of art.

Chess is dedicated to "Jan Krzysztof, count of Tarnów, castellan of Wojnicz."

== Plot ==
Position: a8 black rook, b8 black king, d7 white queen, h7 white rook, b4 black knight, d4 black bishop, b3 black pawn, c3 black pawn, b1 white king

According to Wagner's reconstruction, the match was stopped for the night following 75. Rh7.

Tarses, the king of Denmark, has a daughter named Anna. Of the many foreigners who wanted to marry her, two men, Fiedor and Borzuj, stood out as the most interested. After the two men proclaim that they want to have a duel, Tarses proposes a game of chess instead. Fiedor and Borzuj learn the rules and after spending some time training, meet in Tarses' palace for the game.

Borzuj is chosen to play white and Fiedor black. The game, described as a battle of anthropomorphised pieces starts, comprising the biggest part of the poem. Kochanowski uses the names of the pieces (which are often different from their equivalents in modern Polish) in literal sense, describing the game as a war between infantry soldiers (pawns), knights, bow-wielding priests (bishops), war elephants (rooks), queens and kings. The play is described metaphorically: Captures are referred to as killings, the pieces are said to have emotions. At one point, Borzuj attempts to "resurrect" a dead knight, i.e. illegally put a captured piece on the board. When both queens are killed, the kings are said to look for new wives among their servants – a metaphor of pawn promotion.

The play advances into the endgame and Borzuj indeed promotes and gets a new queen. The match progresses to a position which seems to end with white inevitably mating in its next move (see the diagram). Fiedor sees no way to evade his loss and makes no move, despite urging comments from Borzuj and advice to resign from members of Tarses' court who watch the game. The sun sets with black still not making any move and it is decided that the players will stop the game for the night, to resume on the following day.

Later Anna, who would rather marry Fiedor, visits the room with the chessboard, guarded for the night. She also initially believes that there is no way to evade white's mate, but subsequently notices a chance for black. Anna loudly expresses an enigmatic opinion: That knights know how to fight, priests are good at giving advice, infantry doesn't hesitate to walk forward and that it's no loss to change a dear thing for someone beloved. Before leaving, the princess turns the black rook to the side.

The following day, hopeless Fiedor and content Borzuj meet to finish their game. Fiedor asks the guards about the turned rook and learns about Anna's visit and her words. Borzuj pays no attention, believing she was referring to the real-life knights and priests. Fiedor starts to think deeply and understands that the princess' words are a message with a hidden hint for him: that he should not use the knight and the bishop, but sacrifice the most valuable piece his still has, the rook; before ending the game using the pawns. To get the attention of his spectators, Fiedor proclaims that he will admit loss if he won't be able to mate his opponent in the next three moves. To Borzuj's surprise, black sacrifices the rook and mates with two pawns. Fiedor marries Anna, while Borzuj leaves, declining an invitation to the wedding.

== Critical analysis ==
=== Artistic ===
Chess is written in eleven-syllable verse. It was one of the first Polish language works created by Kochanowski, who was earlier mostly writing elegies and epigrams in Latin. According to prof. Edmund Kotarski of the Gdańsk University, Chess resembles a short story in the parts dealing with the human characters, while the battle of the chess pieces is a parody of heroic epos of Homer and Virgil, "following its style while presenting a plot which clearly was not monumental or grand", so that the "clash between seriousness and humour" results in humorous effects. The poem was described as more humane that Scacchia Ludus which inspired it, as instead of mythological gods, Kochanowski tells a story of two young men fighting for their future.

=== Chess ===
Chess theoretician Władysław Litmanowicz considers Borzuj and Fiedor's playing skills as not extraordinary, but notices that the game's theory was much less advanced in Kochanowski's times compared to the modern day.

The ending combination is a variation of the well-known Dilaram problem. Anna's advice was most likely easily understood by the contemporary readers.

== Reconstruction ==
=== Background ===
In 1912, the Szachista Polski (Polish: Polish Chessplayer) magazine announced a contest to reconstruct the game described in Kochanowski's poem. It ended with only one entry sent – created by Alexander Wagner, who was one of the magazine's employees. Wagner submitted his reconstruction under the pseudonym of "Wanda Reger Nelska" (an anagram of his name), so that his colleagues wouldn't be biased in judging the entries. Most of the commentary in Wagner's work are simply quotations from the poem.

=== Wagner's reconstruction ===
Position: b8 black king, c8 black rook, e8 black bishop, g8 black knight, b7 black pawn, c7 black pawn, g7 black bishop, h7 black rook, c6 white pawn, d6 white pawn, h6 black pawn, f5 black pawn, g5 black pawn, d4 white queen, e4 white pawn, e3 white knight, f3 white knight, h3 white pawn, e2 white bishop, f2 white pawn, g2 white pawn, b1 black queen, e1 white bishop, f1 white king, h1 white rook

Position after 27. ... f5. Borzuj will now touch his e4 pawn and the players will start a quarrel over the touch-move rule

1. d4 d5 2. c3 e5 3. e3 a5 4. b3 h6 5. a3 Na6 6. h3 Bf5 7. Be2 Qd6 8. c4 g6 9. b4 axb4 10. axb4 O-O-O 11. Nf3 Kb8 12. Nc3 Rh7 13. Nxd5 Nxb4 14. Nxe5 Nc2+ 15. Kf1 Nxa1 16. Bd2 g5 17. Qxa1 Be6 18. e4 Bg7 19. Ne3 f6 20. Nf3 Qa6 21. Qb2 Qd6 22. d5 Bd7 23. Qd4 Qb6 24. c5 Qb1+ 25. Be1 Be8 26. c6 Rc8 27. d6 f5

Borzuj touches his e4 pawn, thinking about 28. exf5?. Fiedor immediately captures the white queen with 28. ... Bxd4. Borzuj protests, as he is not aware of the touch-move rule. They eventually agree to cancel the move.

28. Qc4 Nf6 29. Ne5 Qb6 30. Rh2 h5 31. f3 Rd8 32. Bg3 f4

White contemplates whether he would rather want to lose a knight or a bishop and decides to keep the former.

33. Nf5 fxg3 34. Nxg3 Rh8 35. Nd7+ Bxd7 36. cxd7 Rxd7 37. Qc1 Qxd6 38. Qxg5 h4 39. Nf5 Qb6 40. Qf4 Rh5 41. Qc1 c5 42. Ne3 Bh6 43. Kg1 Qd8 44. Kf1 Rd2 45. Kf2 Nd5 46. Qc4 Rxe2+ 47. Qxe2 Nxe3 48. Qe1 Qg5 49. Kg1 c4 50. Qf2 c3 51. Rh1 b6

Borzuj attempts to illegally put his captured knight again on the board, which Wagner renders as 52. Na1–b3?

52. Kh2 Qg3+ 53. Qxg3+ hxg3+ 54. Kxg3 Ra5 55. Kf2 Ra8 56. Ke2 Nc2 57. Kd1 Ne3+ 58. Kc1 Nxg2+ 59. Kb1 b5 60. h4 b4 61. h5 b3 62. e5 Bg5 63. h6 Nh4 64. e6 Bf6 65. h7 Nxf3 66. e7 Bxe7 67. h8=Q+ Kb7 68. Qh3 Ne5 69. Qh5 Nd3 70. Qh3 Nb4 71. Qf3+ Kb8 72. Qe2 Bf6 73. Qe6 Bg7 74. Qd7 Bd4 75. Rh7

The play is suspended for the night after this move.

75. ... Ra1+ 76. Kxa1 b2+ 77. Kb1 c2#

=== Alternative endings ===
In his book В поисках истины (English: Searching for Truth), Grandmaster Yuri Averbakh also reconstructed the game. At the point when the play is stopped for the night, it is a "mirror reflection" of Wagner's work (with the black king on g8, black rook on h8 etc.). However, Averbakh proposed three alternative ways for black to mate. The first one is the same as Wagner's.

The two new variants are (starting from Wagner's reconstruction after 75. Rh7):

75. ... c2+ 76. Kc1 Ra1+ 77. Kd2 c1=Q+ 78. Ke2 Qd1# (or Qd3#) and

75. ... Ra1+ 76. Kxa1 c2+ 77 Qxd4 c1=Q#

Note that the first variant would exceed Fiedor's claim that he'll mate within three moves.

== See also ==
- Chess in the arts and literature
