= The Chess Players (Eakins) =

Painting by Thomas Eakins

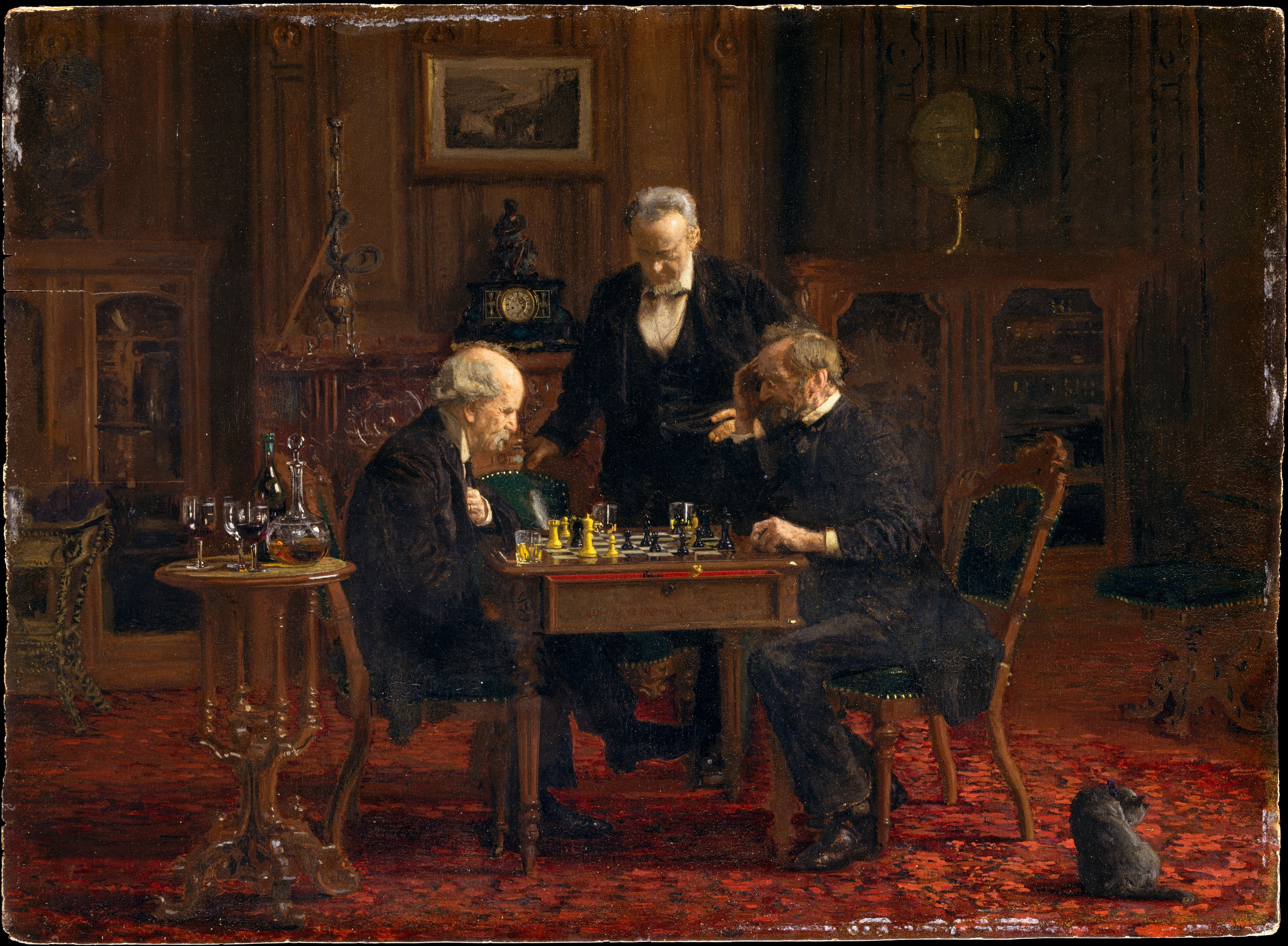
- Artist: Thomas Eakins
- Year: 1876
- Type: Oil on wood panel
- Dimensions: 29.8 cm × 42.6 cm (11 3/4 in × 16 3/4 in)
- Location: Metropolitan Museum of Art; New York

The Chess Players is an 1876 genre painting by the American painter Thomas Eakins, Goodrich catalogue #96. It is in the collection of the Metropolitan Museum of Art, in New York.

Position: c8 black rook, g8 black king, a7 black pawn, e7 white bishop, f7 black pawn, h6 black pawn, e5 black bishop, g5 black pawn, f4 black pawn, h3 white pawn, a2 white pawn, d2 white knight, e2 black knight, h2 white king, e1 white rook

State of the game

== Description ==
It is a small oil on wood panel depicting Eakins' father Benjamin observing a chess match. The two players are Bertrand Gardel (at left), an elderly French teacher, and the somewhat younger George Holmes, a painter. The men are in a dark, wood-panelled Victorian parlour with a quality of light suggesting late afternoon. The game is well in progress, as many pieces have been removed from the board. Holmes, the younger player, seems to be winning the match, as he has taken the queen of his opponent (the top of which pokes out of the table's drawer), and his own black queen is well-positioned in the centre of the board. Eakins painted The Chess Players for his father, and signed the painting in Latin, "BENJAMINI. EAKINS. FILIUS. PINXIT. '76"—"the son of Benjamin Eakins painted this"—in small letters on the drawer of the table. Michael Clapper of Franklin & Marshall College has noted, "Eakins’s choice of [chess] and his knowledgeable treatment of it suggest that he was familiar with and interested in the game, though there is little direct evidence of it apart from the painting."

Art historian Akela Reason proposes that the painting is a tribute to a number of the artist's father-figures: Holmes probably was Eakins's first art teacher; Gardel was his French teacher; Benjamin Eakins was his literal father; and Jean-Léon Gérôme, his master at the École des Beaux-Arts, is represented by a print of Ave Caesar Morituri te Salutant, over the clock.

Author Martin Berger has analyzed the content of the painting in detail, finding it an evocation of the passage of time and ascribing it a highly personal meaning in Eakins' life. The younger chess player's attempt to kill the older player's king is analogous to the Oedipal complex. In the way that his father Benjamin is placed in opposition to Eakins the painter, the two may be envisioned as playing out a psychological "conflict" across the other axis of the chess board. In this light it is not coincidental that the painting was made on wood panel rather than canvas. While Eakins has humbled himself before his father in signing the painting only by reference to being Benjamin's son, he also presents his father ambivalently. Elevating his father's status, he places Benjamin centrally, with the vanishing point behind Benjamin's head. Yet Eakins has obscured his father's face by shadow and by the angle at which he looks down upon the game. Although the painting was dedicated to Benjamin, the title "The Chess Players" curiously leaves Eakins' father out of the narrative of the picture.

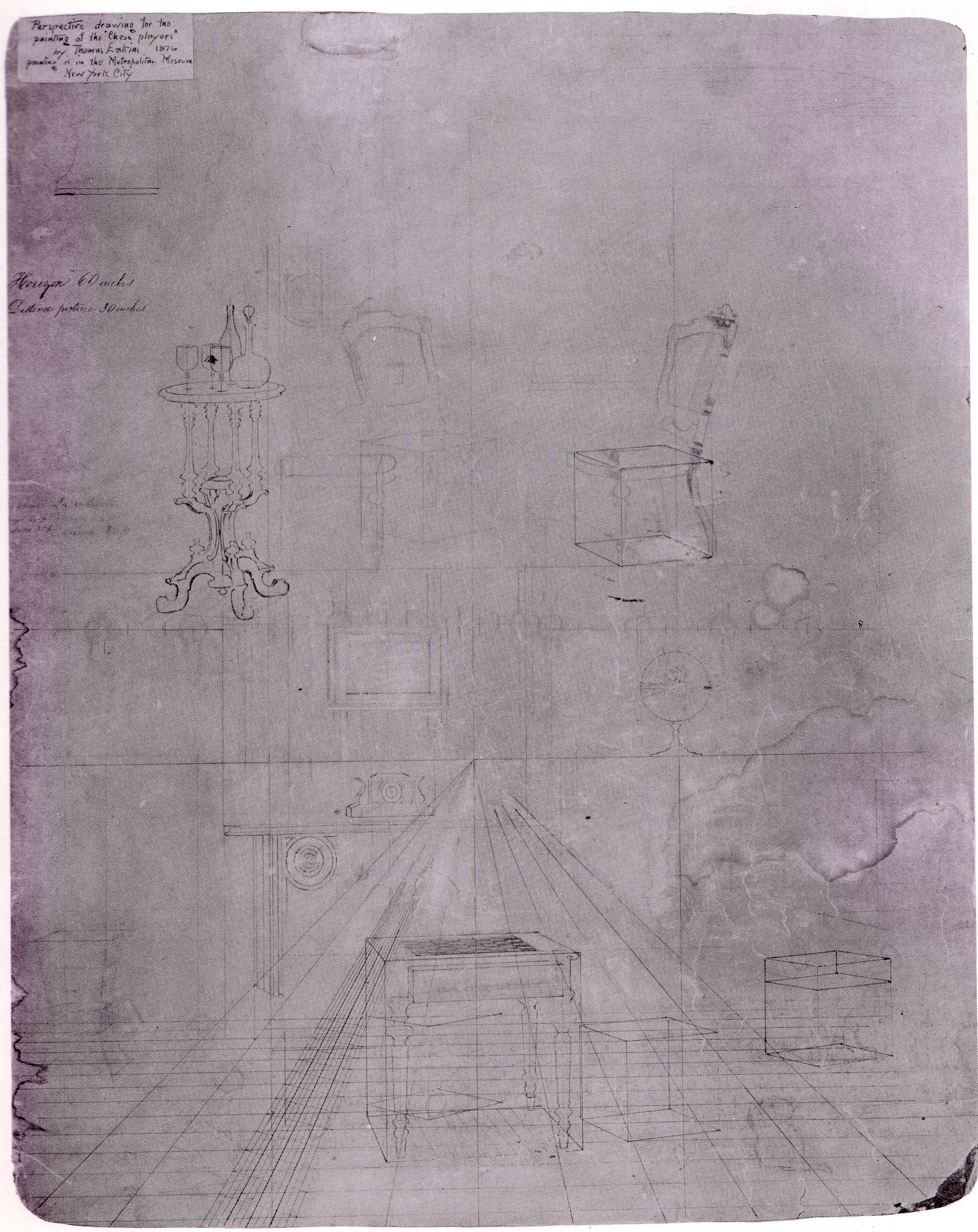
G-97. Perspective Drawing for The Chess Players (1875–76), Metropolitan Museum of Art.

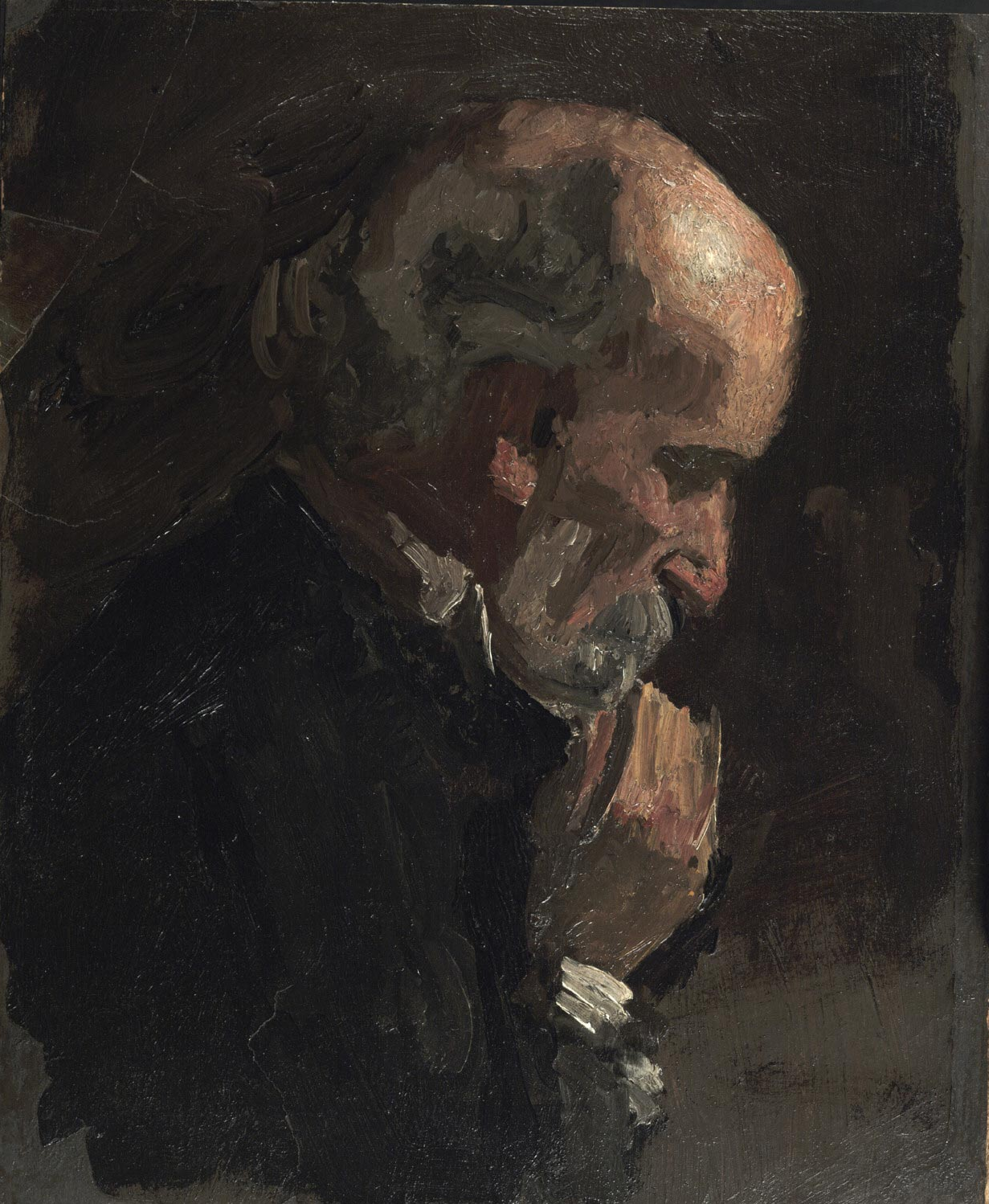
G-98. Study of Bertrand Gardel for The Chess Players, Philadelphia Museum of Art.

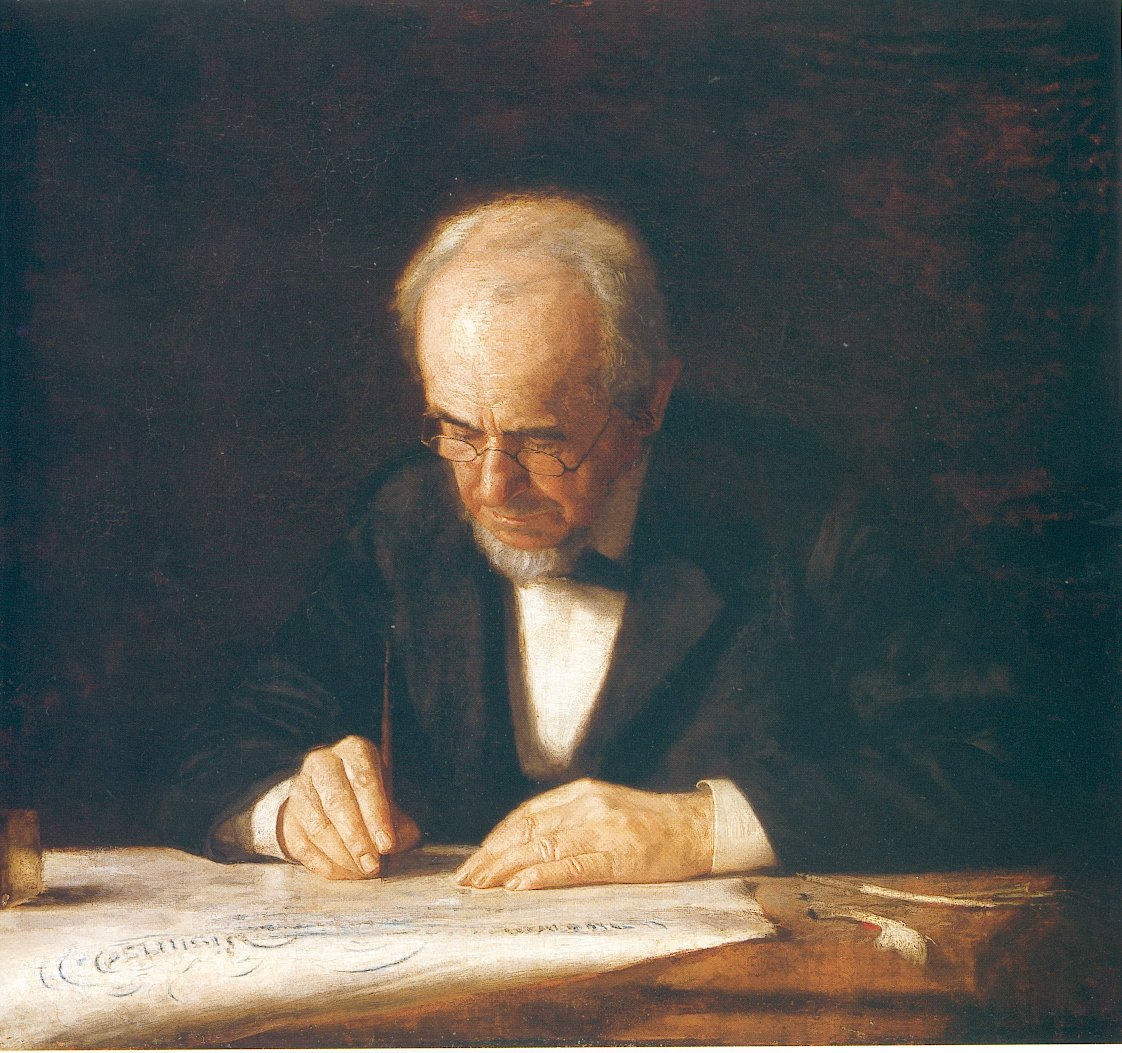
G-188. The Writing Master: Portrait of Benjamin Eakins (1882), Metropolitan Museum of Art.

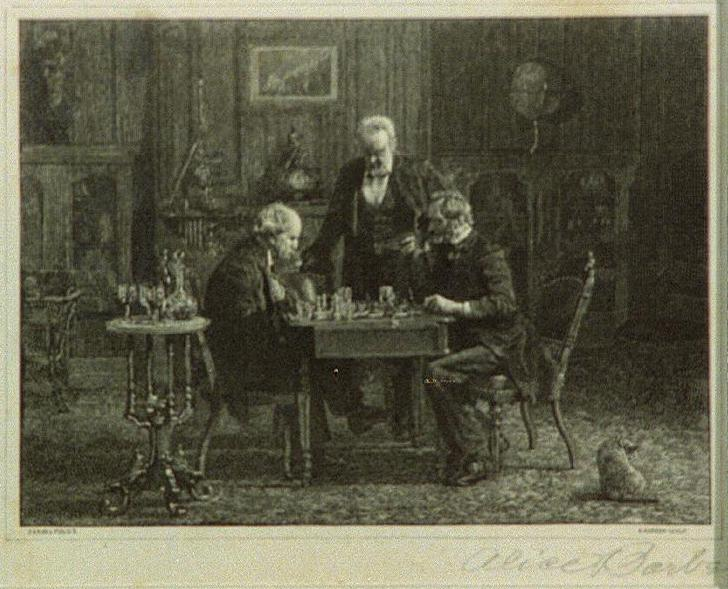
Engraving of The Chess Players by Eakins student Alice Barber Stephens (circa 1880).

== See also ==
- List of works by Thomas Eakins
- Chess in the arts and literature
