= Josef Hartwig =

Bauhaus sculptor, Nazi party member, chess set maker

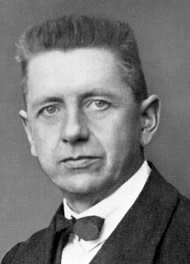
- Born: 19 March 1880; Munich
- Died: 1956 (aged 75–76)

Josef Hartwig (1880–1956) was a Bauhaus sculptor best known for his 1923 minimalist chess set design, known as Bauhaus-Schachspiel in German, or Bauhaus chess in English.

== Personal life ==
Josef Hartwig was born on 19 March 1880 in Munich. Beginning at age 13, he served as an apprentice in the studio of stonemason Simon Korn. During his time in Korn's studio, Hartwig met a number of prominent architects including Theodor Fischer and August Endell.

From 1904 to 1908 Hartwig attended the Academy of Fine Arts, Munich, studying under Balthasar Schmidt. For a brief period after his graduation, he worked as a stonemason, producing gravestones in Berlin.

In 1921, Walter Gropius invited Hartwig to teach at the Bauhaus in Weimar. Hartwig accepted the offer going on to serve as a teacher and head of the sculpture department from 1921 to 1925. During his brief time there, he designed two key Bauhaus pieces: his chess set design, and "Owl" or "Eule" in 1922.

After his tenure at the Bauhaus, Hartwig continued producing sculptural work and began a brief career in art restoration.

During the Third Reich, Hartwig was a member of the Nazi Party, serving as a general.

== Chess sets ==
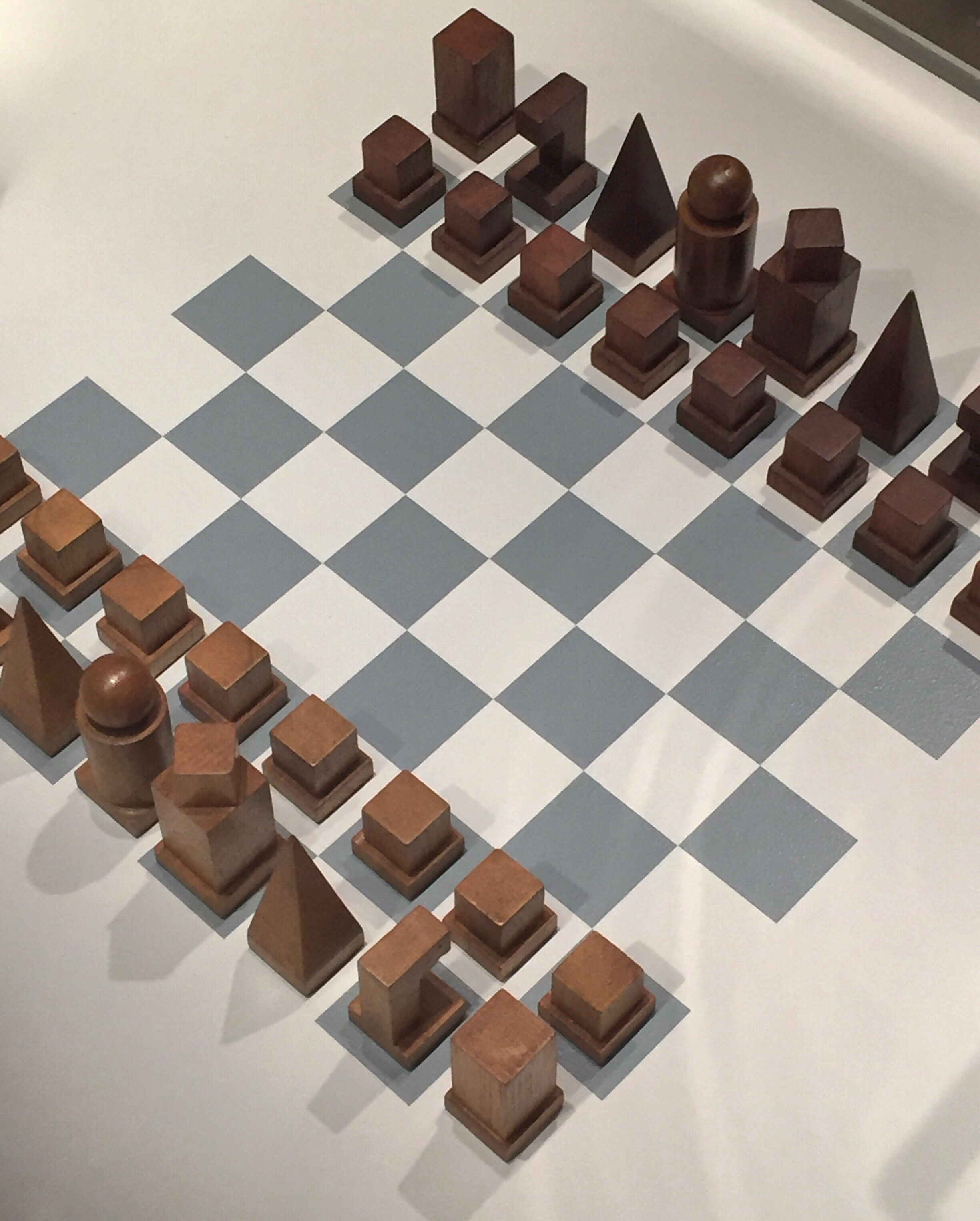
1922 model chess set

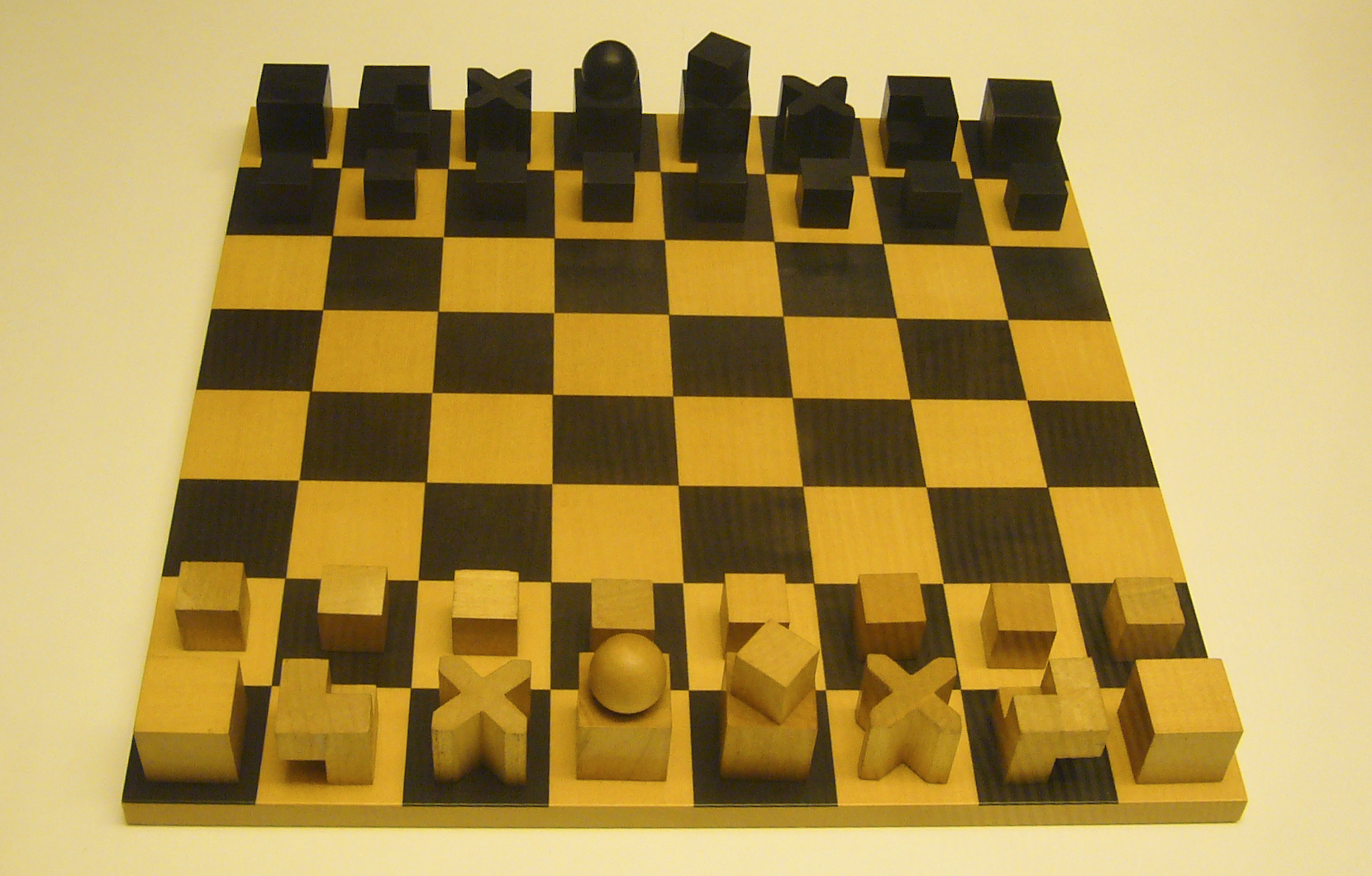
1924 model chess set

From 1922 to 1924, Hartwig designed a series of wooden chess sets, which have now become a famous example of the Bauhaus design sensibilities. The detailed design of the pieces differed from model to model, but all of them feature geometric shapes with a square base---in Model XVI from 1924 the pawns are plain wood cubes.

The design of each piece combines two different forms of representation. First, they abstract the visual appearances of traditional chess pieces into simple geometric shapes. Second, the shape of each piece reflects how it moves: pawns and rooks move in straight lines and are represented as rectangular prisms, the bishops feature diagonal lines, the king has both straight and diagonal elements, and the knights are L-shaped.

The chess sets were sold in two versions, a "daily use" version (Gebrauchsspiel) which cost 51 Marks, and a hand-made "luxury" version (Luxusspiel) which used more expensive types of wood and cost 155 Marks. As was the case with most Bauhaus products, this was too expensive for most consumers, and the chess sets remained a luxury item sold in small numbers.
