= A Chess Dispute =

1903 British film by Robert W. Paul

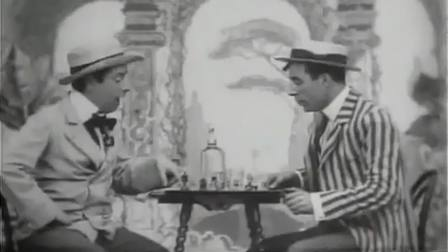
- Screenshot from the film
- Directed by: Robert W. Paul
- Produced by: Robert W. Paul
- Cinematography: Robert W. Paul
- Production company: Paul's Animatograph Works
- Release date: August 1903
- Running time: 1 min
- Country: United Kingdom
- Language: Silent

A Chess Dispute is a 1903 British short black-and-white silent comedy film, directed by Robert W. Paul, starring Alf Collins. It is included on the BFI DVD R. W. Paul: The Collected Films 1895-1908.

== Release ==
The film was released on 31 August 1903.

== Plot ==
The movies depicts a stationary camera which looks on as two dapper gents play a game of chess. One drinks and smokes, and when he looks away, his opponent moves two pieces. A comedic fight ensues, first with the squirting of a soda siphon, then with each punching the other. The opponents wrestle each other to the floor and continue the fight out of the camera's view, hidden by the table. The waiter then arrives to haul them out of the hotel.
