= 1896 in film =

The following is an overview of the events of 1896 in film, including a list of films released and notable births.

== Events ==
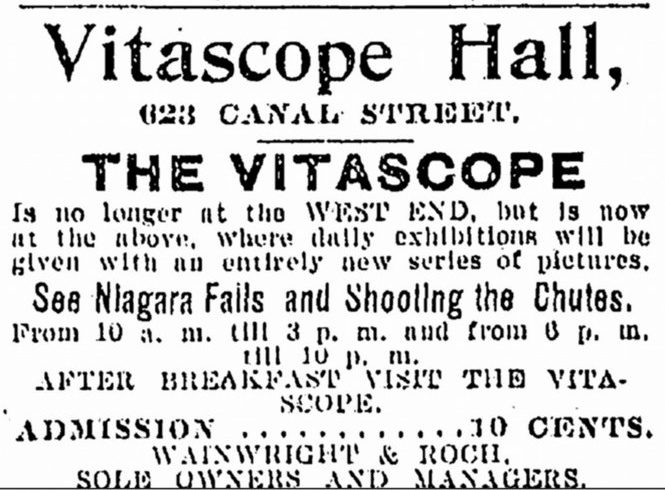
Ad for Vitascope Hall, New Orleans, offering "an entirely new series of pictures".

- January – In the United States, the Vitascope film projector is designed by Charles Francis Jenkins and Thomas Armat. Armat begins working with Thomas Edison to manufacture it.
- January 14 – Birt Acres demonstrates his film projector, the Kineopticon, the first in Britain, to the Royal Photographic Society at the Queen's Hall in London. This is the first film show to an audience in the U.K.
- February 20 – In London:
  - Robert W. Paul demonstrates his film projector, the Theatrograph (later known as the Animatograph), at the Alhambra Theatre.
  - The Lumière Brothers first project their films in Britain, at the Empire Theatre of Varieties, Leicester Square.
- April – Edison and Armat's Vitascope is used to project motion pictures in public screenings in New York City.
- May 14 – Tsar Nicholas II of Russia is crowned in Moscow, the first coronation ever recorded in film.
- July 11 – First films screened in Venezuela by Luis Manuel Méndez and Manuel Trujillo Durán at the Baralt Theatre in Maracaibo.
- July 26 – "Vitascope Hall" opens on Canal Street, New Orleans, the first business devoted exclusively to showing motion pictures at a fixed location
- September 28 – The Pathé Frères film company is founded.
- October 19 – "Edisonia Hall" in Buffalo, New York, the first building constructed specifically for showing motion pictures.
- November 3 – Marius Sestier films the Melbourne Cup, a major sporting event in Australia.
- In France, magician and filmmaker Georges Méliès begins experimenting with the new motion picture technology, developing early special effect techniques, including stop motion. Films that year included The Devil's Castle, A Nightmare, A Terrible Night.
- William Selig founds the Selig Polyscope Company in Chicago.
- Demeny-Gaumont work on a 60 mm format, first known as Biographe (unperforated), then Chronophotographe (perforated).
- Casimir Sivan and E. Dalphin create a 38 mm format.

== Notable films released in 1896 ==
=== Alexandre Promio ===
- Lion, London Zoological Gardens
- Pelicans, London Zoological Gardens

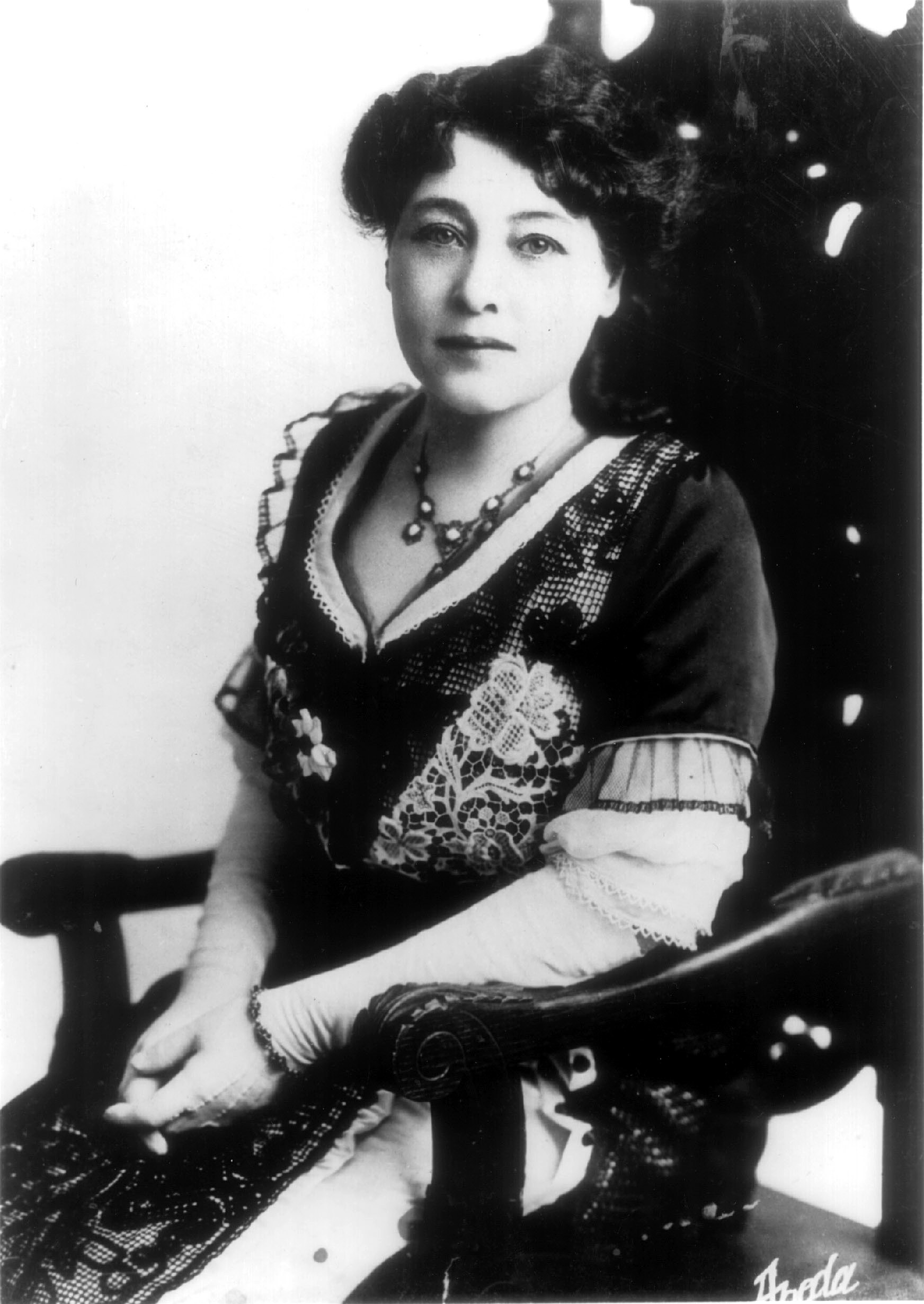
The pioneer filmmaker, Alice Guy, debuted this year.

=== Alice Guy-Blaché ===
- The Cabbage Fairy
- Le chapeau de Tabarin
- Le clubmen
- Les concierges
- Les démolisseurs
- Chez le barbier

=== Birt Acres ===
- The Boxing Kangaroo
- Boxing Match; or, Glove Contest
- Dancing Girls
- Landing at Low Tide
- Rough Sea at Dover directed with Robert W. Paul
- Yarmouth Fishing Boats Leaving Harbour

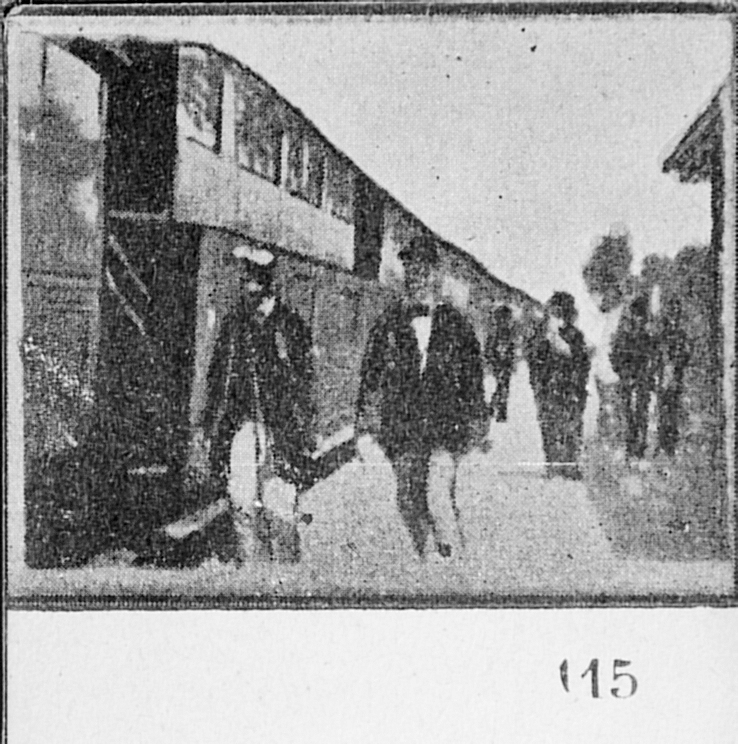
Maybe a surviving print of the film Arrival of a Train at Vincennes Station.

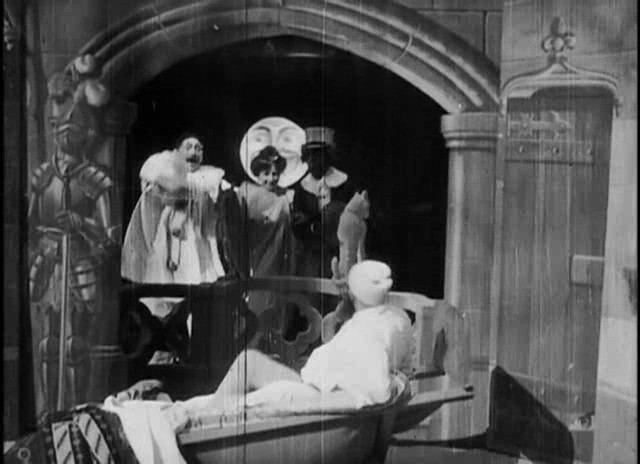
Screenshot of A Nightmare.

=== Gabriel Veyre ===
- Carga de rurales, a Mexican short black-and-white silent documentary film.
- Un duelo a pistola en el bosque de Chapultepec (Duel au pistolet).

=== Georges Méliès ===
- Arrival of a Train at Vincennes Station, currently presumed to be a lost film
- A Lightning Sketch, a series of four French short silent films (lost)
- A Nightmare, which was advertised as a scène fantastique.
- A Serpentine Dance, which was released by Méliès's company Star Film and is numbered 44 in its catalogues (lost)
- A Terrible Night, which is listed with the descriptive subtitle scène comique.
- Conjurer Making Ten Hats in Sixty Seconds (lost)
- Conjuring, the film was rediscovered in 2014
- Miss de Vère (English Jig)
- The Haunted Castle (a.k.a. The House of the Devil, a.k.a. The Devil's Castle)
- The Rag-Picker
- The Rescue on the River
- The Vanishing Lady
- Playing Cards
- Post No Bills
- Watering the Flowers, most likely a lost film

=== Louis Lumière ===
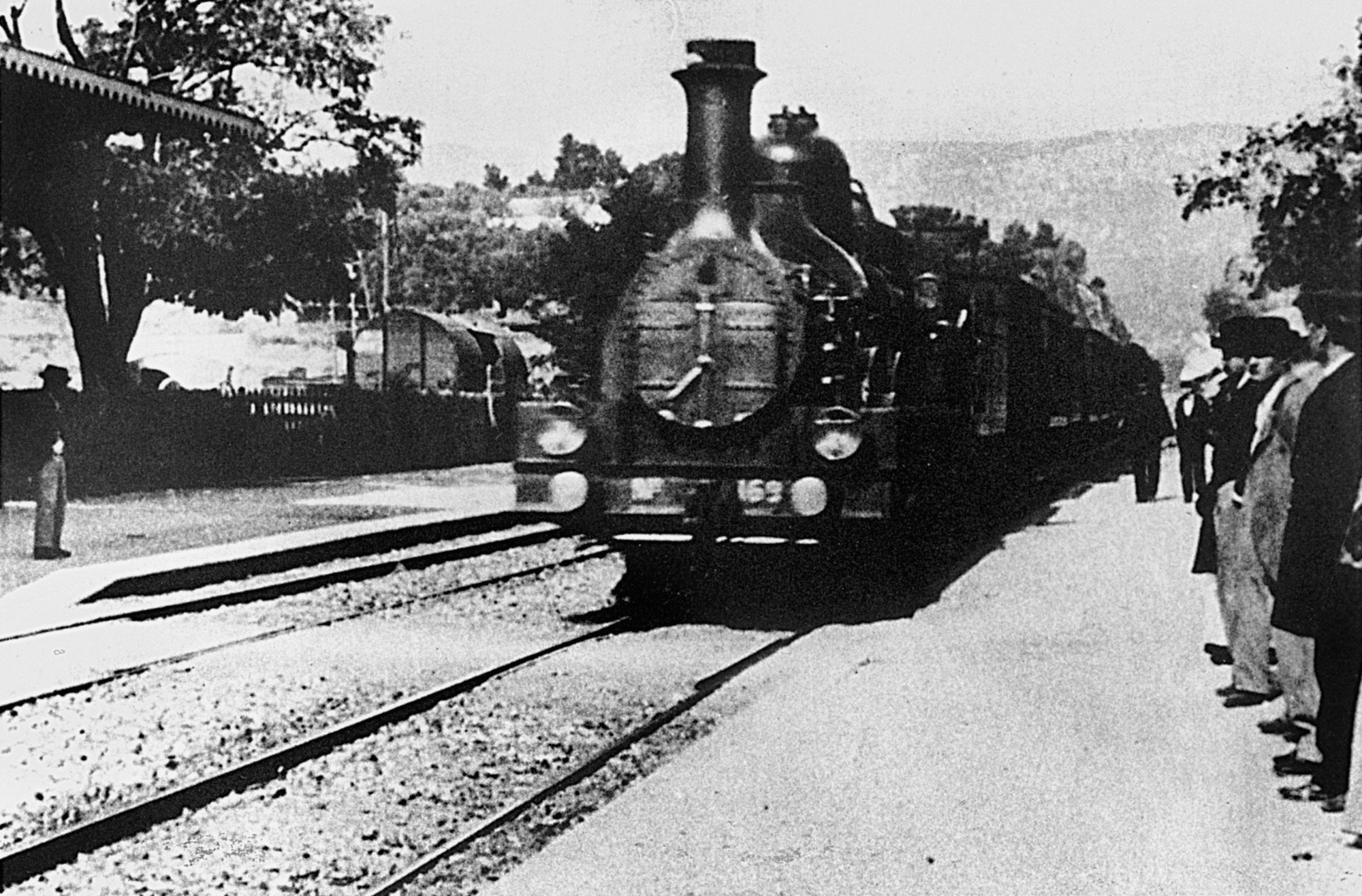
Contrary to myth, Arrival Of A Train At La Ciotat it was not shown at the Lumières' first public film screening on December 28, 1895, in Paris, France: the programme of ten films shown that day makes no mention of it. Its first public showing took place in January 1896.

- Arab Cortege, Geneva
- Arrival Of A Train At La Ciotat
- Bataille de boules de neige
- Carmaux, Drawing Out The Coke
- Childish Quarrel
- Children Digging For Clams
- Démolition d'un mur
- Dragoons Crossing The Saone
- Loading A Boiler
- New York: Broadway At Union Square
- New York: Brooklyn Bridge
- Poultry-Yard
- Pompiers a Lyon
- Promenade Of Ostriches, Paris Botanical Gardens
- Serpentine Dance

=== M.H. Laddé ===
- Gestoorde hengelaar (lost)
- Spelende kinderen (lost)
- Zwemplaats voor Jongelingen te Amsterdam (lost)

=== Robert W. Paul ===
- Barnet Horse Fair
- Blackfriars Bridge
- Comic Costume Race
- Rough Sea at Dover directed with Birt Acres
- The Twins' Tea Party
- Two A.M.; or, the Husband's Return produced by Robert W. Paul

=== William Heise ===
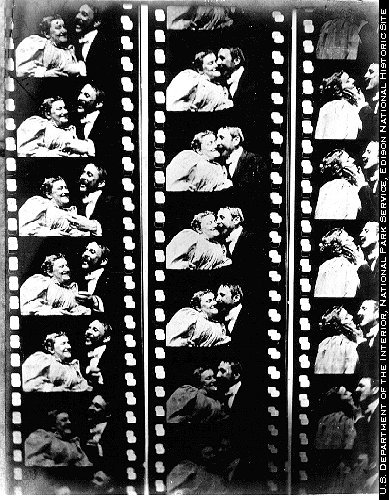
The first kiss ever on film is in 1896 involving the great Canadian star May Irwin and John C. Rice.

- Feeding The Doves
- The Kiss, starring May Irwin and John Rice. First kiss on film. May be considered the first romantic film.

=== William K.L. Dickson ===
- Dancing Darkies, an American, short, black-and-white, silent documentary film.
- A watermelon feast, directed by William Kennedy Dickson.

=== Others ===
- Le Coucher de la Mariée, a French erotic short film considered to be one of the first erotic films (or "stag party films") made. The film was produced by Eugène Pirou and directed by Albert Kirchner under the pseudonym "Léar".
- Macintyre's X-Ray Film, a documentary radiography film directed by Scottish medical doctor John Macintyre.
- McKinley at Home, Canton, Ohio, is a silent film reenactment of William McKinley receiving the Republican nomination for President of the United States in September 1896 produced by the American Mutoscope and Biograph Company.
- A Morning Alarm, produced by Edison Studios.
- A Sea Cave Near Lisbon, a British short silent actuality film, directed by Henry Short.
- Up the River, directed by Unknown.

== Births ==
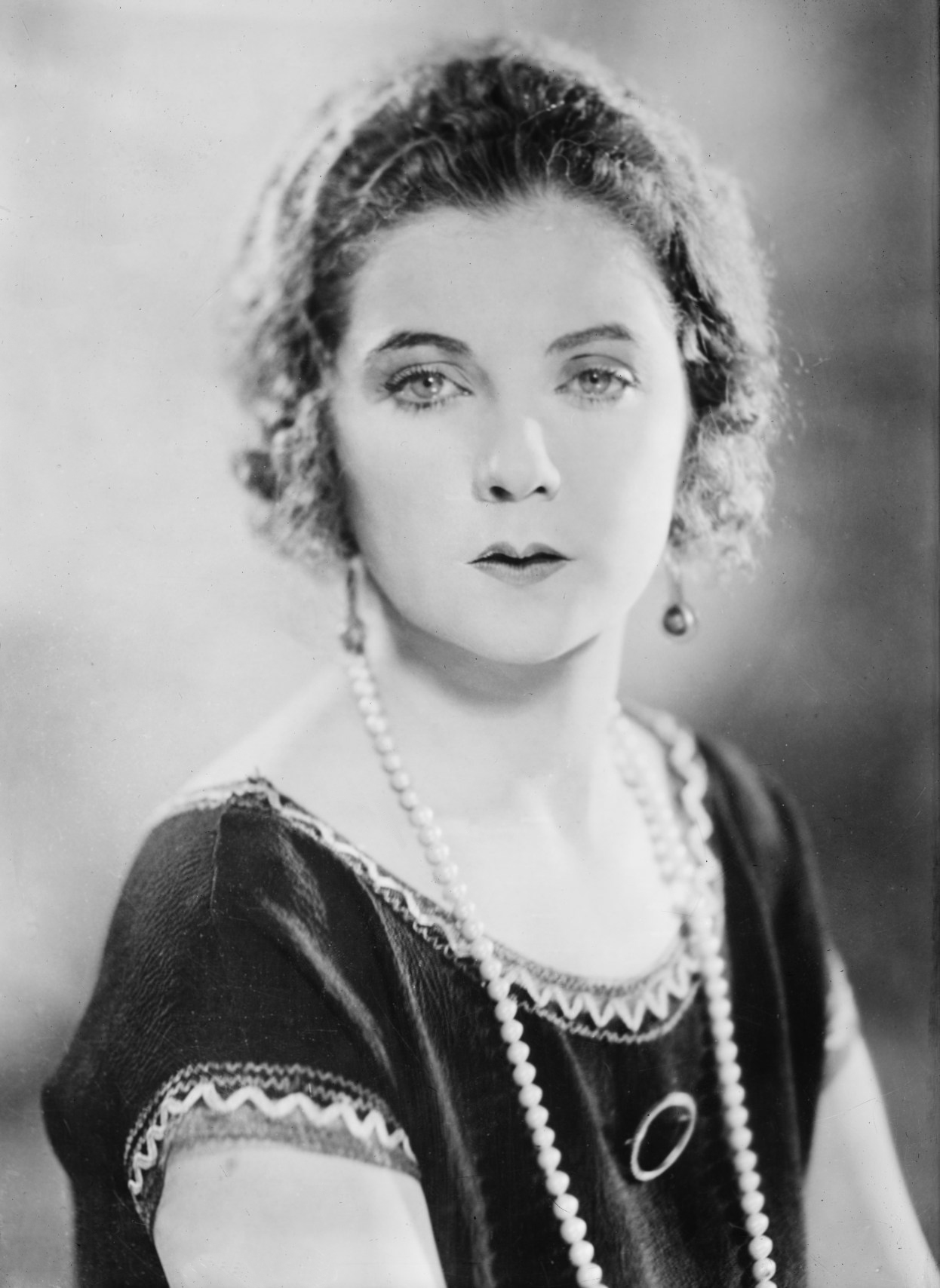
Lilyan Tashman was an American vaudeville, Broadway, and film actress.

Month	Date	Name	Country	Profession	Died
January	20	George Burns	US	Actor, Comedian	1996
January	20	Rolfe Sedan	US	Actor	1982
January	20	Isabel Withers	US	Actress	1968
March	3	Willie Fung	China	Actor	1945
April	8	Einar Juhl	Denmark	Actor	1982
April	26	Ruut Tarmo	Estonia	Actor	1967
May	16	Gilda Langer	Germany	Actress	1920
May	17	Ruth Donnelly	US	Actress	1982
May	24	Fernando Soler	Mexico	Actor	1979
June	28	Constance Binney	US	Actress, Singer, Dancer	1989
July	16	Evelyn Preer	US	Actress, Singer	1932
July	25	Jack Perrin	US	Actor	1967
August	14	Theodor Luts	Estonia	Director, Cinematographer	1980
August	18	Jack Pickford	Canada	Actor	1933
August	30	Raymond Massey	Canada	Actor	1983
October	1	Abraham Sofaer	US	Actor	1988
October	6	David Howard	US	Director	1941
October	23	Lilyan Tashman	US	Actress	1934
October	30	Rex Cherryman	US	Actor	1928
November	16	Lawrence Tibbett	US	Actor, Singer	1960
December	8	Christl Mardayn	Austria	Actress, Singer	1971
December	10	Torsten Bergström	Sweden	Actor, Director	1948

== Debut ==
- Alice Guy as a director in Les démolisseurs
- May Irwin as an actress in The Kiss (April 1)
- John C. Rice as an actor in The Kiss (April 1)
- Cissy Fitzgerald as an actress in 50 feet of actuality film of Fitzgerald by Edison; presumably elements from the 1894 play The Gaiety Girl
- Robert B. Mantell as an actor in Select Scenes from 'Monbars'
