= 1896 in Wales =

- Centuries: 17th; 18th; 19th; 20th; 21st
- Decades: 1870s; 1880s; 1890s; 1900s; 1910s
- See also: List of years in Wales; Timeline of Welsh history 1896 in The United Kingdom Scotland Elsewhere

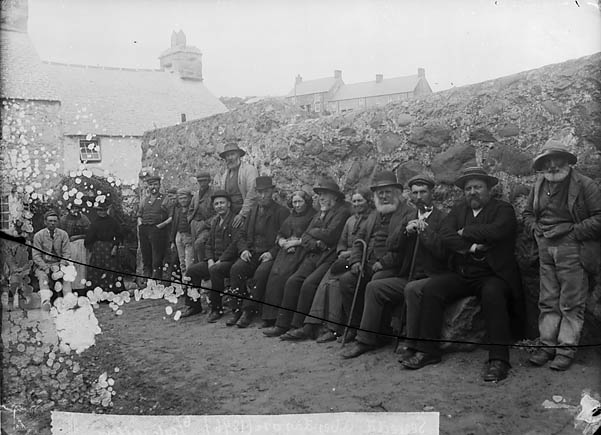

This article is about the particular significance of the year 1896 to Wales and its people.

== Incumbents ==
- Archdruid of the National Eisteddfod of Wales – Hwfa Môn
- Lord Lieutenant of Anglesey – Richard Davies (until 27 October); Sir Richard Henry Williams-Bulkeley, 12th Baronet (from 30 November)
- Lord Lieutenant of Brecknockshire – Joseph Bailey, 1st Baron Glanusk
- Lord Lieutenant of Caernarvonshire – John Ernest Greaves
- Lord Lieutenant of Cardiganshire – Herbert Davies-Evans
- Lord Lieutenant of Carmarthenshire – John Campbell, 2nd Earl Cawdor
- Lord Lieutenant of Denbighshire – William Cornwallis-West
- Lord Lieutenant of Flintshire – Hugh Robert Hughes
- Lord Lieutenant of Glamorgan – Robert Windsor-Clive, 1st Earl of Plymouth
- Lord Lieutenant of Merionethshire – W. R. M. Wynne
- Lord Lieutenant of Monmouthshire – Henry Somerset, 8th Duke of Beaufort
- Lord Lieutenant of Montgomeryshire – Sir Herbert Williams-Wynn, 7th Baronet
- Lord Lieutenant of Pembrokeshire – William Edwardes, 4th Baron Kensington (until 7 October); Frederick Campbell, 3rd Earl Cawdor (from 23 November)
- Lord Lieutenant of Radnorshire – Powlett Milbank
- Bishop of Bangor – Daniel Lewis Lloyd
- Bishop of Llandaff – Richard Lewis
- Bishop of St Asaph – A. G. Edwards (later Archbishop of Wales)
- Bishop of St Davids – Basil Jones

== Events ==
- 28 January – In an underground explosion at Tylorstown Colliery, Rhondda, 57 miners are killed.
- February – Construction of the Snowdon Mountain Railway is completed.
- 27 March – Colonel Sir Francis Marindin makes an unofficial inspection of the Snowdon Mountain Railway line on behalf of the Board of Trade. This includes a demonstration of the automatic brakes.
- 6 April – The Snowdon Mountain Railway commences public operation. On the first trip down the mountain, locomotive No.1 "Ladas" with two carriages loses the rack and is derailed. A passenger dies after jumping from the carriage. The second train down collides with the wreckage of the first; services are suspended for a year.
- c. May – Opening of Empire Exhibition at Sophia Gardens, Cardiff, including a roller coaster.
- 14 May – Garth Pier, Bangor, opened by George Douglas-Pennant, 2nd Baron Penrhyn.
- June – The Prince and Princess of Wales visit Aberystwyth, where the prince is installed as chancellor of the University of Wales and the princess opens the new pier pavilion.
- 1 August – Aberystwyth Cliff Railway and camera obscura opened.
- 24 September – William Frost flies his Frost Airship Glider for the only time.
- 30 September—August 1897 – Lock-out of slate workers at Penrhyn Quarry.
- 11 October – While attending Sunday service in St Deiniol's Church, Hawarden (on a visit to Gladstone), the Archbishop of Canterbury, Edward White Benson, dies of a heart attack. His body is subsequently transported home by train.
- Bishop of Menevia, John Cuthbert Hedley, is one of a group of Roman Catholic bishops who successfully petition Pope Leo XIII to lift the ban on Catholic students attending British universities, providing that the universities agreed to allow Catholic professors to teach theology and history, "with such exhaustiveness and soundness that the minds of the young men may be effectively fortified against errors".
- Opening of Shotton steelworks.
- Opening of the first indoor swimming pool in Wales, at Guildhall Crescent, Cardiff.

== Arts and literature ==
=== Awards ===
National Eisteddfod of Wales – held at Llandudno

- Chair – Ben Davies, "Tuhwnt i'r llên"
- Crown – withheld

=== New books ===
- Owen Morgan Edwards – Cartrefi Cymru
- Bertrand Russell – German Social Democracy

=== Music ===
- Nicholas Bennett – Alawon fy Ngwlad
- David Jenkins – Four Welsh Airs

=== Film ===
- 5 May – Birt Acres' The Oxford and Cambridge University Boat Race (1895) becomes the first film in the UK to be commercially screened outside London when it is shown at Cardiff Town Hall.
- 27 June - The first Royal news film ever shot in Britain shows the Prince and Princess of Wales visiting the Cardiff Exhibition.

== Sport ==
- Football – The Welsh Cup is won by Bangor for the second time in its 17-year history.

== Births ==
- 18 January – Walter James, 4th Baron Northbourne, agriculturist (died 1982)
- 7 March – Charlie Pugh, Wales national rugby player (died 1951)
- 21 March – Dai Edwards, Wales dual-code rugby international (died 1960)
- 4 April – W. S. Gwynn Williams, musician (died 1978)
- 1 May – Hubert William Lewis, VC recipient (died 1977)
- 6 May – Wilfred Hodder, Wales international rugby player (died 1957)
- 7 May – Edgar Morgan, dual-code rugby international (died 1983)
- 13 August – Walter Price, footballer
- 28 August – Dai Davies, cricketer (died 1976)
- 1 September – Steve Morris, Wales national rugby player (died 1965)
- 11 September – John Morris, Baron Morris of Borth-y-Gest, judge (died 1979)
- 15 September – Owen Temple-Morris, politician (died 1985)
- 4 December – Hugh Percy Wilkins, selenographer (died 1960)

== Deaths ==
- 7 January – William James, clergyman, Principal of Carmarthen Trinity College, 63
- 17 January – Augusta Hall, Baroness Llanover, patron of the arts, 93
- 26 February – Octavius Vaughan Morgan, politician, 59
- 17 March – Gethin Davies, Welsh Baptist minister and college principal, 49
- 5 April – John Rogers Thomas, Welsh-descended American songwriter and composer, 66
- 10 April – John Edward Jones, Governor of Nevada, 55
- 25 April – Charles Williams-Wynn, politician, 73
- 23 July – Arthur Linton, cyclist, 27
- 1 August – William Robert Grove, lawyer, judge and scientist, 85
- 7 October – William Edwardes, 4th Baron Kensington, Lord Lieutenant of Pembrokeshire, 61
- 27 October – Richard Davies, businessman, ship-owner and politician, 77
- 25 December – John Ashton, composer, 66
- 30 December – Evan Herber Evans, Nonconformist leader, 60

== See also ==
- 1896 in Ireland
