= 1895 in the United Kingdom =

Events from the year 1895 in the United Kingdom.

== Incumbents ==
- Monarch – Victoria
- Prime Minister – Archibald Primrose, 5th Earl of Rosebery (Liberal) (until 22 June); Robert Gascoyne-Cecil, 3rd Marquess of Salisbury (Coalition) (starting 25 June)

== Events ==
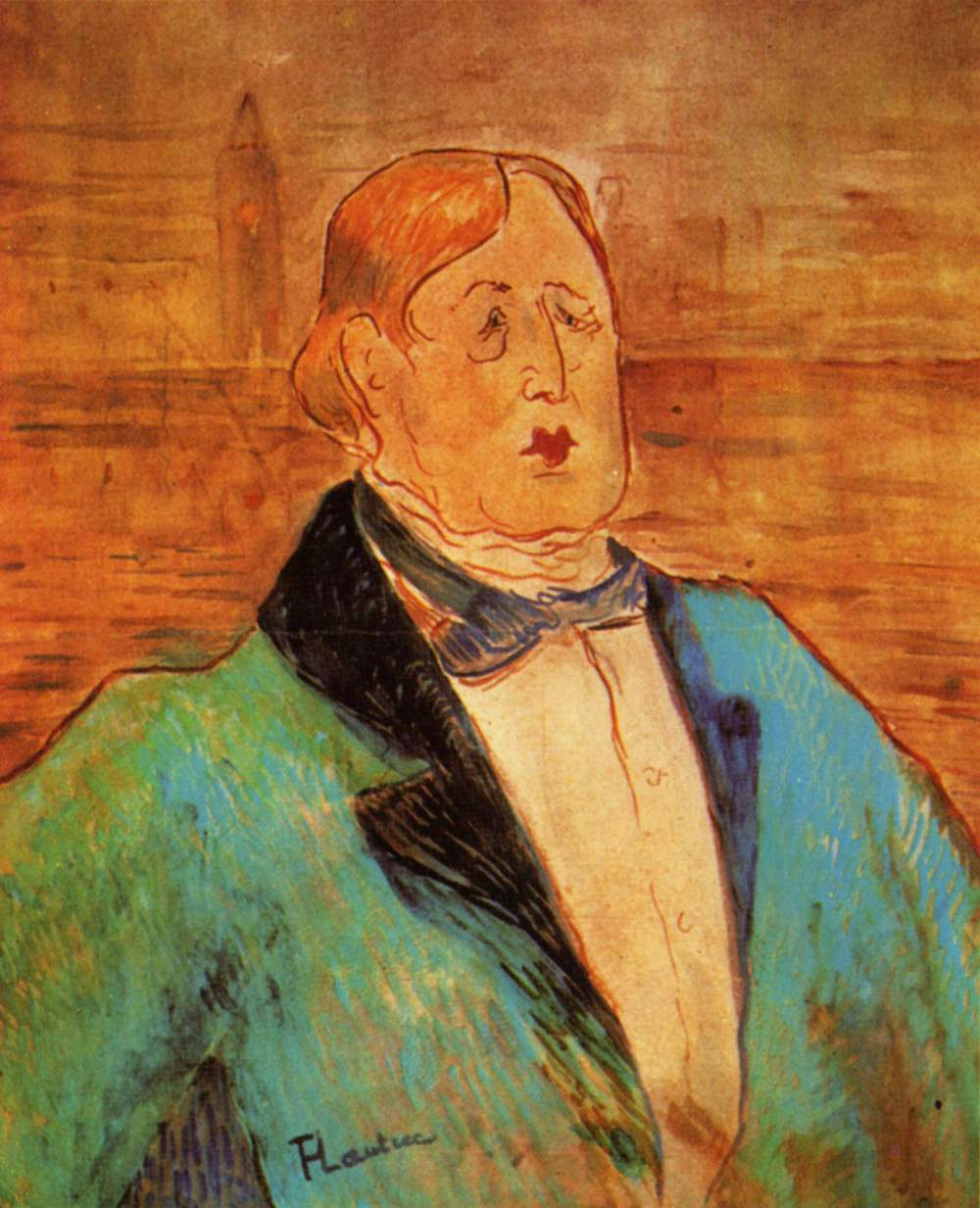
Toulouse-Lautrec's portrait of Oscar Wilde on the night before his trial opens

- January–February – "Great Frost".
- 3 January – première of Oscar Wilde's comedy An Ideal Husband at the Haymarket Theatre in London.
- 5 January – première of Henry James's historical drama Guy Domville at the newly renovated St James's Theatre in London is booed.
- 12 January – the National Trust for Places of Historic Interest or Natural Beauty is founded in England by Octavia Hill, Sir Robert Hunter and Canon Hardwicke Rawnsley.
- 14 January – Diglake Colliery Disaster in the North Staffordshire Coalfield: a flood of water underground causes the deaths of 77 miners; only three bodies are recovered .
- 25 January – first international hockey match: Wales v. Ireland.
- 6 February – Pope Leo XIII issues a decree blessing the Marian image of Our Lady of Walsingham for Catholic veneration at her newly restored shrine.
- 11 February – the lowest ever UK temperature of −27.2 °C (measured as −17 °F) is recorded at Braemar in Aberdeenshire. (This UK Weather Record is equalled in 1982 and again in 1995.)
- 14 February – première of Oscar Wilde's last play, the comedy The Importance of Being Earnest, at St James's Theatre, London.
- 18 February – the Marquess of Queensberry (father of Lord Alfred Douglas, Oscar Wilde's lover), leaves his calling card at the Albemarle Club in London, inscribed: "For Oscar Wilde, posing somdomite", i.e. a sodomite, inducing Wilde to charge him with criminal libel.
- March – Birt Acres films Incident at Clovelly Cottage in Chipping Barnet, the "first successful motion picture film made in Britain".
- 6 March – Snailbeach lead mine disaster in Shropshire: 7 men are killed when a winding cable breaks.
- 16 March – first international hockey match played by an England team: England v. Ireland at Richmond, Surrey. England win 5–0.
- 29 March – the National Trust acquires, by donation, its first landholding for preservation, Dinas Oleu, above Barmouth in Wales.
- 30 March – Birt Acres films The Oxford and Cambridge University Boat Race.
- 3–5 April – libel case of Wilde v Queensberry at the Old Bailey in London: Queensberry, defended by Edward Carson, is acquitted. Evidence of Wilde's homosexual relationships with young men renders him liable to criminal prosecution under the Labouchere Amendment, while the Libel Act 1843 renders him legally liable for the considerable expenses Queensberry has incurred in his defence, leaving Wilde penniless.
- 6 April – Oscar Wilde is arrested at the Cadogan Hotel, London, for "unlawfully committing acts of gross indecency with certain male persons" and detained on remand in Holloway Prison.
- 15 April – the Welsh Grand National steeplechase is run for the first time, at Ely Racecourse, Cardiff. A huge crowd breaks down barriers and almost overwhelms police trying to keep out gatecrashers. Deerstalker is the winner but the horse Barmecide breaks its neck.
- April – First-class cricket as defined by the MCC is first played in England from this season.
- 1 May – Dundela Football, Sports & Association Club is formed in Belfast.
- 2 May – British South Africa Company's territory south of the Zambesi renamed 'Rhodesia'.
- 25 May
  - Criminal case of Regina v. Wilde: After a retrial at the Old Bailey, Oscar Wilde is convicted of gross indecency and is taken to Pentonville Prison to begin his two years' sentence of hard labour. On 21 November he is transferred to Reading Gaol.
  - Henry Irving becomes the first actor invested with a knighthood.
- 29 May – Sir Visto becomes the second horse to win the Epsom Derby for owner Lord Rosebery, the Prime Minister.
- 11 June – Britain annexes Tongaland.
- 21 June – Lord Rosebery resigns as Prime Minister after defeat in a vote of no confidence in the House of Commons over the supply of cordite to the army. Lord Salisbury returns to the office on 25 June.
- 6 July – Hon Evelyn Ellis makes the first trip in England with an imported motor car, driving his Panhard from Micheldever railway station to his home in Datchet.
- 13 July–7 August – general election is won by the Conservative Party, confirming Lord Salisbury as Prime Minister.
- 15 July – Archie MacLaren scores a County Championship record innings of 424 for Lancashire against Somerset at Taunton.
- July – Oldham Athletic A.F.C. is founded as Pine Villa.
- 10 August
  - Bolton Wanderers F.C. move into their new Burnden Park stadium.
  - The first ever indoor promenade concert, origin of The Proms, is held at the Queen's Hall, Langham Place, London, opening a series promoted by impresario Robert Newman with 26-year-old Henry Wood as sole conductor.
- 29 August – the Northern Rugby Football Union is formed at a meeting in the George Hotel, Huddersfield. This is becomes the governing body for the sport of Rugby league, known as the Rugby Football League. The first league matches are played on 7 September, one being staged at Mount Pleasant, Batley, making it the longest-surviving ground to hold league matches.
- 11 September – the FA Cup is stolen from a shop window in Birmingham; it is never recovered.
- 14 September – Derby County F.C. move into the Baseball Ground, which was built five years ago to serve the town's unsuccessful baseball team.
- 29 September – railway police officer Robert Kidd (born 1857) is killed at Wigan railway station.
- 4 October – English golfer Horace Rawlins, 21, wins the first U.S. Open golf tournament.
- 10 October – the London School of Economics holds its first classes.
- 15 October – first motor show in Britain held at Tunbridge Wells.
- 1 November – the last turnpike toll-gates in the UK are removed, from Llanfairpwllgwyngyll on Anglesey.
- November – the Lee–Enfield rifle is adopted as standard issue by the British Army, remaining in service until the 1960s.
- December – Fourth Anglo-Ashanti War begins.
- 24 December – Kingstown Lifeboat Disaster: In Ireland, the Kingstown life-boat capsizes on service: all fifteen crew are lost.
- 29 December – the Jameson Raid: invasion of Transvaal.

=== Undated ===
- Percy Pilcher flies in several versions of his hang glider Bat at Cardross, Argyll, the first person to make repeated heavier-than-air flights in the U.K.
- The name 'HP Sauce' is first registered for a brown sauce manufactured in the midlands.
- Lifebuoy soap first marketed by Lever Brothers.
- North British Aluminium Company builds Britain's first aluminium smelting plant on the shore of Loch Ness at Foyers, Scotland.
- All England Women's Hockey Association founded, the first women's national sporting governing body.

== Publications ==
- Grant Allen's "New Woman" novel The Woman Who Did.
- Hilaire Belloc's poetry collection Verses and Sonnets.
- Joseph Conrad's novel Almayer's Folly.
- Kenneth Grahame's reminiscences The Golden Age (complete in book form).
- Thomas Hardy's novel Jude the Obscure (conclusion of expurgated serialisation and complete in book form (dated 1896)).
- Rudyard Kipling's collection The Second Jungle Book.
- H. G. Wells' novella The Time Machine.
- Times Atlas of the World.
- The Autocar first published (2 November).

== Births ==
- 10 February – John Black, industrialist, chairman of Standard-Triumph (died 1965)
- 18 February – Lazarus Aaronson, poet and academic economist (died 1966)
- 2 March – Hughie Ferguson, footballer (died 1930)
- 28 March – James McCudden, flying ace (died 1918)
- 12 April – John Erskine, Lord Erskine, soldier and politician (died 1953)
- 29 April – Malcolm Sargent, conductor (died 1967)
- 8 May – Lionel Whitby, haematologist, clinical pathologist, pharmacologist and army officer (died 1956)
- 30 May – Maurice Tate, cricketer (died 1956)
- 9 June – Violet Cressy-Marcks, née Rutley, explorer (died 1970)
- 2 July – Leslie Frise, aerospace engineer and aircraft designer (died 1979)
- 13 July – Geoffrey Hawkins, admiral (died 1980)
- 24 July – Robert Graves, writer (died 1985)
- 6 September – Margery Perham, Africanist (died 1982)
- 7 September – Brian Horrocks, general (died 1985)
- 27 September – Woolf Barnato, English racing driver and financier (died 1948)
- 31 October – Basil Liddell Hart, military historian (died 1970)
- 1 November – David Jones, artist and poet (died 1974)
- 1 December – Henry Williamson, author (died 1977)
- 2 December – Harriet Cohen, pianist (died 1967)
- 14 December – King George VI (died 1952)
- 17 December – Wee Georgie Wood, actor and comedian (died 1979)
- 24 December – Noel Streatfeild, children's author (died 1986)
- 25 December – Sarah Ward, politician (died 1965)
- 30 December – L. P. Hartley, novelist (died 1972)

== Deaths ==
- 24 January – Lord Randolph Churchill, statesman (born 1849)
- 5 March – Sir Henry Rawlinson, politician and Orientalist (born 1810)
- 10 March – Charles Frederick Worth, fashion designer (born 1825)
- 7 May – Susanna Innes-Ker, Duchess of Roxburghe, Lady of the Bedchamber to Queen Victoria (born 1814)
- 15 May – Joseph Whitaker, publisher (born 1820)
- 31 May – Emily Faithfull, women's rights activist (born 1835)
- 29 June – Thomas Henry Huxley, biologist (born 1825)
- 5 August – Friedrich Engels, Marxist thinker (born 1820 in Germany)
- 11 October – Sir Lewis Jones, admiral (born 1797)
- 25 October – Sir Charles Hallé, orchestral conductor (born 1819 in Germany)
- 28 November – L. S. Bevington, anarchist poet and essayist (born 1845)

== See also ==
- List of British films before 1920
