= Tigers, London Zoological Gardens =

1896 short film directed by Alexandre Promio

- Screenshot from the film
- Directed by: Alexandre Promio
- Produced by: Auguste and Louis Lumière
- Release date: 1896
- Country: France
- Language: Silent

Tigers, London Zoological Gardens (French: Tigres, Jardin zoologique, Londres) is an 1896 French short black-and-white silent actuality film, produced by Auguste and Louis Lumière and directed by Alexandre Promio, featuring two tigers reaching through the bars of its enclosure at London Zoological Gardens to get at the meat offered on a stick by their keeper. The film was part of a series, including Lion and Pelicans, which were one of the earliest examples of animal life on film.
