= Pelicans, London Zoological Gardens =

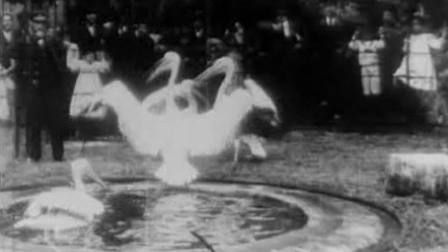
- Screenshot from the film
- Directed by: Alexandre Promio
- Produced by: Auguste and Louis Lumière
- Release date: 1896
- Country: France
- Language: Silent

Pelicans, London Zoological Gardens (French: Pélicans, Jardin zoologique, Londres) is an 1896 French short black-and-white silent actuality film, produced by Auguste and Louis Lumière and directed by Alexandre Promio, featuring pelicans following their keeper around their enclosure at London Zoological Gardens. The film was part of a series, including Lion and Tigers, which were one of the earliest examples of animal life on film.

== See also ==
- Pelicans at the Zoo, 1898 film
