= Lion, London Zoological Gardens =

- Screenshot from the film
- Directed by: Alexandre Promio
- Produced by: Auguste and Louis Lumière
- Release date: 1896
- Country: France
- Language: Silent film

Lion, London Zoological Gardens (French: Lions, Jardin zoologique, Londres) is an 1896 French short black-and-white silent actuality film, produced by Auguste and Louis Lumière and directed by Alexandre Promio, featuring a male lion reaching through the bars of its enclosure at London Zoological Gardens to get at the meat thrown by its keeper. The film was part of a series, including Tigers and Pelicans, which were one of the earliest examples of animal life on film.

== Current status ==
This short film is available to freely download from the Internet.
