= Pelicans at the Zoo =

- Screenshot from the film
- Production company: British Mutoscope & Biograph Company
- Release date: 1898
- Country: United Kingdom
- Language: Silent

Pelicans at the Zoo is an 1898 British short black-and-white silent actuality film, produced by British Mutoscope & Biograph Company, featuring pelicans being released for feeding into their enclosure at London Zoological Gardens. The film was part of a series, with Elephants at the Zoo, which were one of the earliest examples of animal life on film.

== See also ==
- Pelicans, London Zoological Gardens, 1896 film
