= The Twins' Tea Party =

1896 film by Robert W. Paul

- Screenshot from the film
- Directed by: Robert W. Paul
- Produced by: Robert W. Paul
- Production company: Paul's Animatograph Works
- Release date: August 1896
- Running time: 42 secs
- Country: United Kingdom
- Language: Silent

The Twins' Tea Party is an 1896 British short silent actuality film, produced and directed by Robert W. Paul. The film "was one of the very first 'facials'," which according to Michael Brooke of BFI Screenonline was "a popular genre in early British cinema that exploited what to 1896 audiences was the astonishing novelty of being able to see moving images of recognisable people in medium close-up as they reacted to a particular situation." John Barnes, author of The Beginnings of the Cinema in England, adds that "this charming one-shot film of two infant girls reluctantly sharing tea was one of the most popular items exhibited in R.W. Paul's programmes at the Alhambra Theatre in 1896."

The film was remade in 1898, and distributed under the title Tea: The Twins' Tea Party. This version was promoted as "an improved edition of the favourite Twins' Tea Party."

== Plot ==
The film features twin girls squabbling over a piece of cake at a tea party. One girl slaps the other a few times, arguing over the cake. Then, when the other girl cries, the first girl feels sorry and makes up, hugging and kissing her.

== Release and reception ==
The film was first shown at the Alhambra Theatre, London in August 1896, as part of a programme of films by R. W. Paul. A review in The Era stated: "The droll gestures of two children at a nursery tea-party evoke much merriment."

The film was later distributed in America by Thomas A. Edison, Inc., whose film catalogue described it as containing "the most perfect and child-like facial expressions we have yet had the pleasure of seeing."
