= Blackfriars Bridge (disambiguation) =

Blackfriars Bridge is a road and foot traffic bridge across the River Thames in Central London.

Blackfriars Bridge may also refer to:

- Blackfriars Railway Bridge, running parallel to the road bridge
- Blackfriars Bridge, Manchester
- Blackfriars Street Bridge in London, Ontario
- Blackfriars Bridge (film), a late 19th-century silent film
