= Yarmouth Fishing Boats Leaving Harbour =

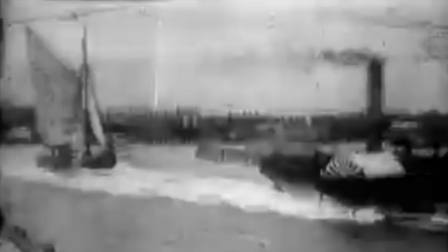
- Screencap from the film
- Directed by: Birt Acres
- Produced by: Birt Acres
- Cinematography: Birt Acres
- Release date: 1896
- Running time: 33 seconds
- Country: United Kingdom
- Language: Silent

Yarmouth Fishing Boats Leaving Harbour (also known as Yarmouth Trawlers ) is an 1896 British short black-and-white silent documentary film, directed by Birt Acres, featuring a fleet of fishing smacks leaving the harbour at Great Yarmouth, Norfolk, UK.

== Synopsis ==
Three fishing boats are seen leaving the harbour at Great Yarmouth. Only the tail end of the first is seen as it leaves the harbour to the right. The second (named Thrive and registered as YH 120) is pulled by a steam paddle tugboat. A third fishing boat (named I Will and registered as YH 723) sails off-screen to the right.

== Production ==
The film was shot by Birt Acres in June or July 1896. It was the first time moving pictures were shot in East Anglia. It was filmed from a single position at the Gorleston Pier end of the harbour, looking back towards Great Yarmouth itself. It was one of two films Birt Acres shot in Yarmouth. The second, which was premiered in 1897, has not survived, but depicted passengers being loaded onto (or unloaded from) a pleasure boat on the beach.

Like other actuality films of the period, the film has no on-screen title, and the name by which the film is generally known is based on its content and references in contemporary sources.

== Release ==
The "attractive Victorian film," was according to Christian Hayes of BFI Screenonline, "one of the twenty-one subjects presented by Birt Acres to the royal family on 21 July 1896, the day before the marriage of Princess Maud to Prince Charles of Denmark, at one of the first royal film performances."

== Legacy ==
The film was long considered lost but footage discovered in the Henville collection in 1995 has been identified by the BFI as being from this film. This "decaying print," according to Patrick Russell of the BFI, "was discovered and duplicated just in time for 1996's celebration of 100 years of projected film in Britain." Hayes concludes that "the fragmentary nature of the film - the jarring cuts and the deterioration of the print - only serve to make it all the more intriguing."
