= Two A.M.; or, the Husband's Return =

1896 film by Robert W. Paul

- Screenshot from the film
- Written by: Paul Clerget
- Produced by: Robert W. Paul
- Starring: Paul Clerget; Ethel Ross-Selwicke
- Production company: Paul's Animatograph Works
- Release date: August 1896
- Running time: 1 min 8 secs
- Country: United Kingdom
- Language: Silent

Full film

Two A.M.; or, the Husband's Return is an 1896 British short silent comedy film, produced by Robert W. Paul, featuring a drunken husband returning home late at night to the irritation of his wife. The film which, "was almost certainly sourced from a concurrent stage production," is according to Michael Brooke of BFI Screenonline, "a study in often quite risqué body language, with the husband the worse for drink, and the wife determined both to remonstrate with him and to get him undressed and into bed as quickly as possible."
