= Crude Set Drama =

1895 British film by Birt Acres

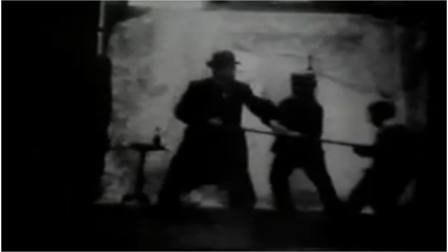
- Screenshot from the film
- Directed by: Birt Acres
- Produced by: Birt Acres; Robert W. Paul
- Cinematography: Birt Acres
- Release date: 1895
- Running time: 36 secs
- Country: United Kingdom
- Language: Silent

Crude Set Drama (AKA: Untitled Kinetoscope Comedy) is an 1895 British short black-and-white silent comedy film, produced and directed by Birt Acres for exhibition on Robert W. Paul's peep show Kinetoscopes, featuring two drunken men and a boy squabbling in a small bar. The film was long considered lost but footage discovered in the Henville collection in 1995 has been identified by the BFI as being from this film.
