= Boca do Inferno =

Tourist attraction in Cascais, Portugal

Coordinates: 38°41′28″N 9°25′52″W

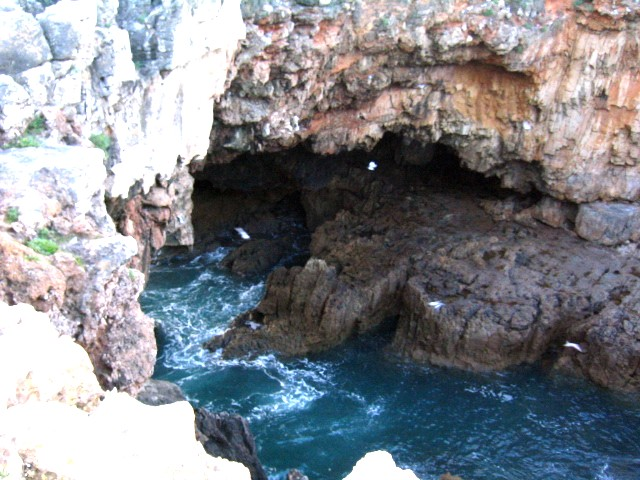
Hell's Mouth near Cascais.

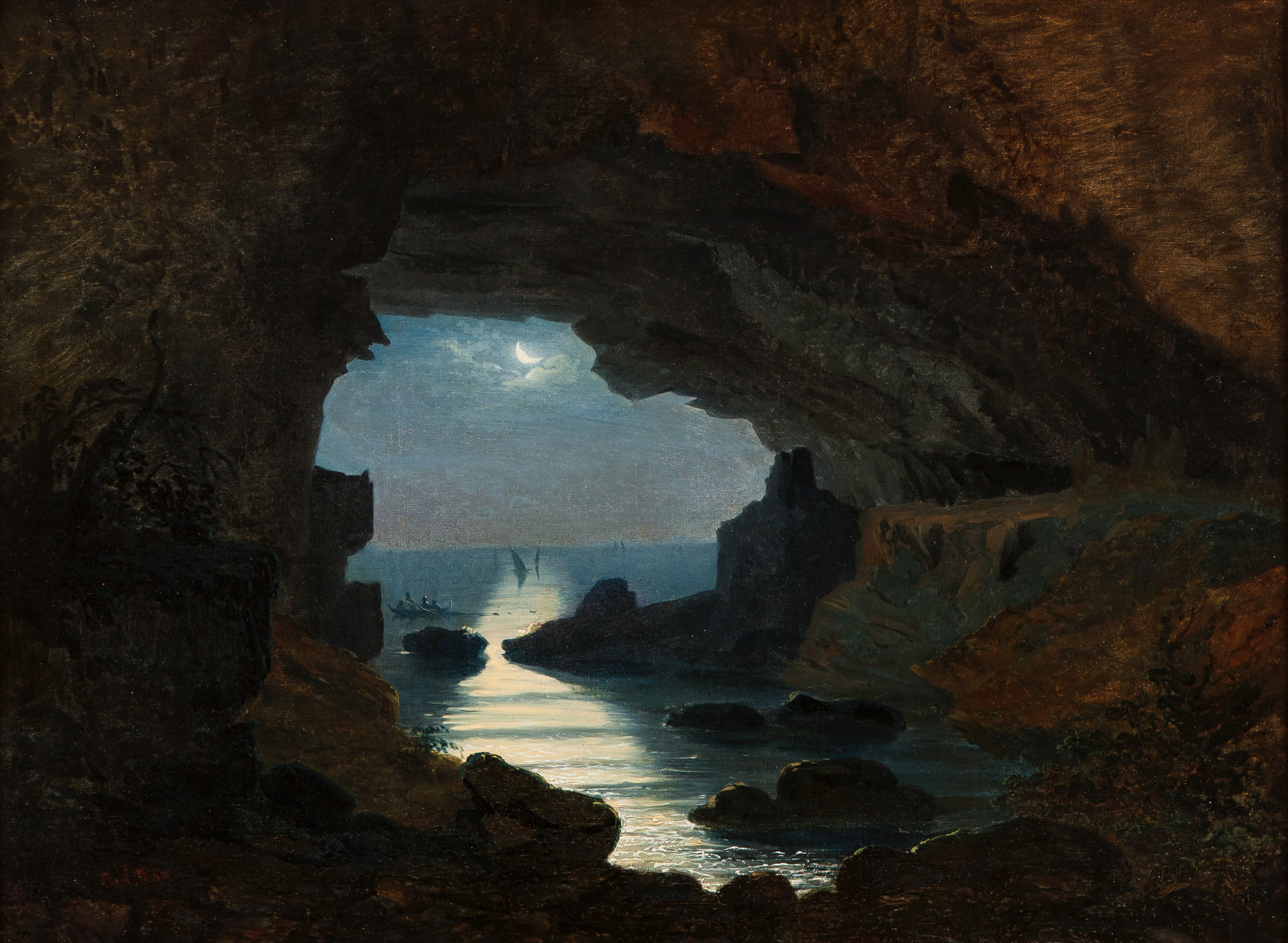
Hell's Mouth, by João Cristino da Silva, c. 1863-65

Boca do Inferno (Portuguese for Hell's Mouth) is a chasm located in the seaside cliffs close to the Portuguese city of Cascais, in the District of Lisbon. The seawater has access to the deep bottom of the chasm and vigorously strikes its rocky walls, making it a popular tourist attraction. The cave was the first to be depicted in moving pictures, in the 1896 British film A Sea Cave Near Lisbon, which shows waves breaking at the mouth of the cave.
