= Performing Animals; or, Skipping Dogs =

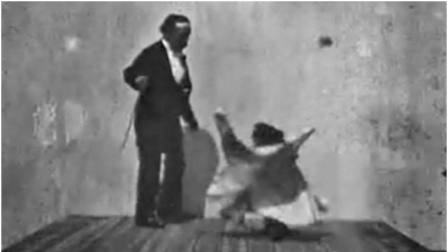
- Screenshot from the film
- Directed by: Birt Acres
- Produced by: Birt Acres; Robert W. Paul
- Cinematography: Birt Acres
- Release date: 1895
- Running time: 19 seconds remain.
- Country: United Kingdom
- Language: Silent

Performing Animals; or, Skipping Dogs is an 1895 British short black-and-white silent documentary film, produced and directed by Birt Acres for exhibition on Robert W. Paul's peep show Kinetoscopes, featuring one dog jumping through hoops and another dancing in a costume. The film was considered lost until footage from an 1896 Fairground Programme, originally shown in a portable booth at Hull Fair by Midlands photographer George Williams, donated to the National Fairground Archive was identified as being from this film.

== Current status ==
Given its age, this short film is available to freely download from the Internet.
