= The Boxing Kangaroo =

1896 British film by Birt Acres

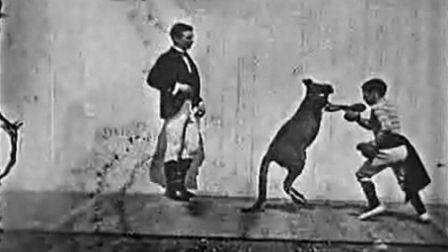
- Screenshot from the film
- Directed by: Birt Acres
- Produced by: Birt Acres; Robert W. Paul
- Cinematography: Birt Acres
- Release date: January 1896
- Country: United Kingdom
- Language: Silent

The Boxing Kangaroo is an 1896 British short black-and-white silent documentary film, produced and directed by Birt Acres for exhibition on Robert W. Paul's peep show Kinetoscopes. It features a young boy boxing with a kangaroo and was long considered lost. Its as rediscovered when footage from an 1896 Fairground Programme was identified as being from the film. The programme had originally been shown iat Hull Fair, the a portable booth run by Midlands photographer George Williams, and was later donated to the National Fairground Archive.

It was one of at least four boxing-themed films Acres produced in 1896, the others being Boxing Match; or, Glove Contest, A Boxing Match in Two Rounds by Sgt. Instructor F.Barrett and Sgt. Pope and A Prize Fight by Jem Mace and Burke. The year before, German filmmaker Max Skladanowsky had made a similar film depicting a man boxing with a kangaroo, entitled Das boxende Känguruh.
