= Ernest Florman =

Swedish director, film photographer and royal photographer

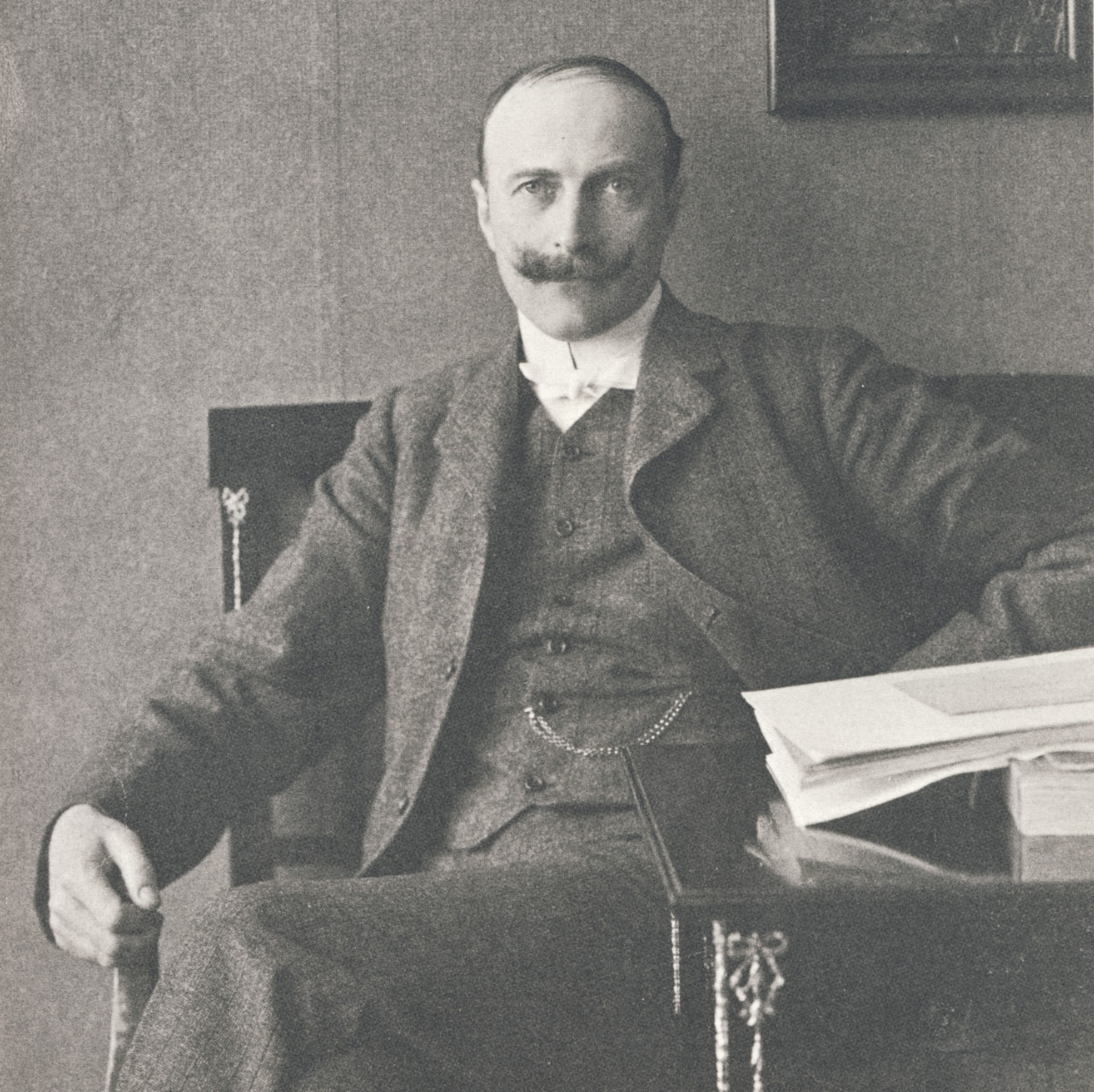
- Ernest Florman in 1906
- Born: 20 September 1863
- Died: 15 September 1952 (aged 88)
- Occupation: Film director
- Known for: Slagsmål i Gamla Stockholm; Byrakstugan

Ernest Florman (20 September 1863 – 15 September 1952) was a Swedish director, film photographer and royal photographer.

His father Gösta Florman established a photography firm in Kristinehamn, Värmland. In 1867 he moved to Karlstad and in 1871 to Stockholm where he had his studio at Regeringsgatan 28 A. In 1900 the company changed its name to Ateljé Florman and control passed to Ernest.

== Biography ==
Florman's short film Konungens af Siam landstigning vid Logårdstrappan is often referred to as the first completely Swedish film. It documents the arrival of King Chulalongkorn of Siam at the Logårdstrappan at Stockholm Castle, where he was received by King Oscar II. The film was shown by Florman on 13 July 1897 and again on 19 July 1897 at the General Art and Industrial Exposition of Stockholm (1897). The recording equipment had been brought there by the French film photographer Alexandre Promio, as he was in Sweden doing work for the Lumière Brothers to present his new medium. Promio took on Florman as his apprentice in this new artistic medium.

During the 1897 Exhibition two Swedish feature films were made. One was Slagsmål i Gamla Stockholm and was filmed by Promio with Florman as an assistant. The film had its premiere on 3 July 1897. At the same time Florman filmed and directed the film Byrakstugan which had its premiere on 14 August 1897.

Between 1901 and 1936 Florman was the chairman of Svenska Fotografers Förbund.

== Films ==
- 1897 – Byrakstugan
- 1897 – Akrobat med otur
- 1897 – Konungens af Siam landstigning vid Logårdstrappan
- 1903 – Sköna Helena
