= The Arrest of a Pickpocket =

1895 British silent short film by Birt Acres

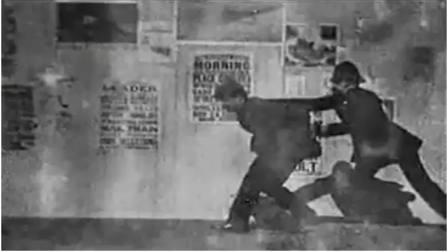
- Screencap from the film
- Directed by: Birt Acres
- Produced by: Birt Acres; Robert W. Paul
- Cinematography: Birt Acres
- Production company: Robert W. Paul
- Release date: May 1895
- Country: United Kingdom
- Language: Silent

The Arrest of a Pickpocket is an 1895 British short black-and-white silent crime film, produced and directed by Birt Acres for exhibition on Robert W. Paul's peep show Kinetoscopes, featuring a policeman catching a pickpocket with the assistance of a passing sailor. The film was considered lost until footage from an 1896 Fairground Programme, originally shown in a portable booth at Hull Fair by Midlands photographer George Williams, donated to the National Fairground Archive was identified as being from this film.
