= Incident at Clovelly Cottage =

1895 film by Birt Acres

Coordinates: 51.6532292°N 0.1971497°W

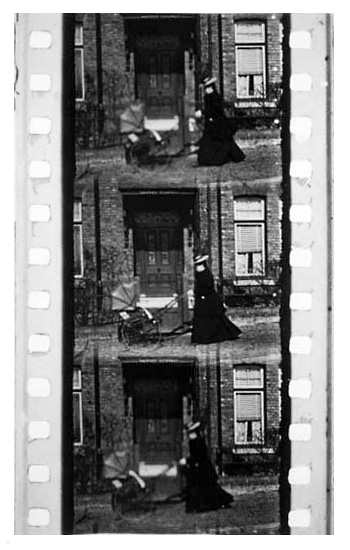
- Frames from the film
- Produced by: Birt Acres, Robert W. Paul
- Cinematography: Birt Acres
- Release date: March 1895
- Country: United Kingdom
- Language: Silent

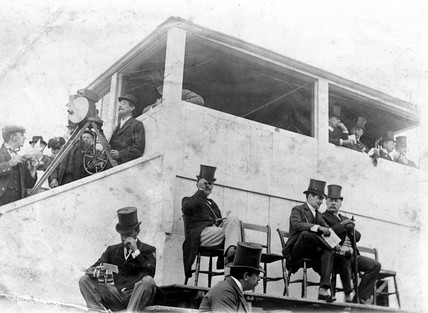
Birt Acres (left behind camera) filming the 1895 Derby using the Paul-Acres camera

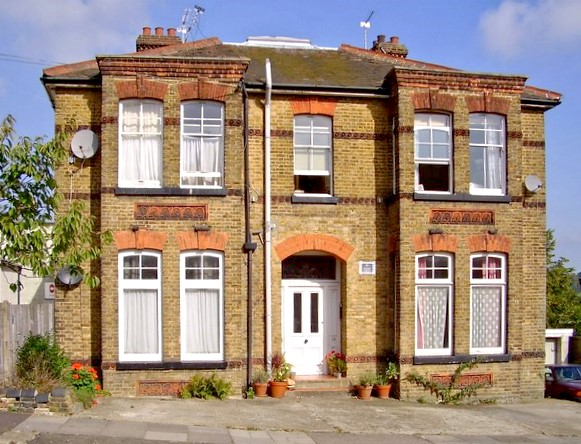
Clovelly Cottage, 2007

Incident at Clovelly Cottage, also known as Incident Outside Clovelly Cottage, Barnet, shot by Birt Acres and produced by Acres and his collaborator Robert W. Paul in March 1895, was the "first successful motion picture film made in Britain".

== Background ==
In 1894, Robert Paul was asked to make a copy of Thomas Edison's Kinetoscope device, in which motion pictures were viewed by one person at a time through a peephole. He initially refused, but after he discovered that the machine had not been patented in Europe, he purchased one of the devices and set about manufacturing a replica which he sold in Britain and France.

The only films available to show on Paul's Kinetoscope replicas, however, were those made by Edison who restricted distribution to his own customers. Paul was therefore obliged to make his own films and to produce a camera on which to shoot them. The result was the Paul-Acres Camera, developed jointly by Paul and Acres using ideas from both. It was the first motion picture camera made in Britain and took pictures on 35mm film at a rate of 40 per second, the same as Edison's Kinetoscope, and the same gauge film as used in modern cinema films.

== Trial ==
In February 1895 Paul and Acres made a short film known as Cricketer Jumping Over Garden Gate, featuring their mutual friend, and Acres' assistant, Henry Short in cricket whites performing that act. It was not shown commercially and is described by John Barnes as a "trial film" and by the British Film Institute as an untitled "test film".

It is notable for the relatively crude perforation of the sprocket holes which differ from the even perforation of Incident at Clovelly Cottage by which time Paul had refined his technique sufficiently to send a clip to Edison seeking an exchange of films produced to the same standard. Edison refused. It is held by the Cinématheque Française in the Will Day Collection, CNC.

== The film ==
Incident at Clovelly Cottage was shot by Acres on the Paul-Acres Camera and produced by Acres and Paul in March 1895. It has been described as the "first British film" and the "first successful motion picture film made in Britain."

The plot is unknown as the film is lost with only a few frames surviving, but from the surviving material we know it featured a woman with a pram, thought to be Acres' wife with their infant son, and a man in white who was identified by Acres as Henry Short. It was filmed outside Acres' home of Clovelly Cottage, 19 Park Road, Chipping Barnet in England. The house still exists and once had a commemorative plaque but that has since been removed.

Contemporary positive frames from the film are in the Kodak Collection in Bradford and the Barnes Collection, St Ives, Cornwall. An additional contemporary sample, sent by Paul to Thomas Edison in March 1895, is in the archives of the Thomas Edison National Historical Park in the United States.

== Later developments ==
Acres and Paul's next film was The Oxford and Cambridge University Boat Race, completed on 30 March 1895. This and other films were shown on Kinetoscopes that Paul set up at Imre Kiralfy's Empire of India Exhibition at Earls Court. Films were not projected onto screens for a mass audience, however, until early 1896 when Paul and Acres separately demonstrated projectors after their partnership ended in acrimony the previous year.
