= William Mecham =

British artist (1853–1902)

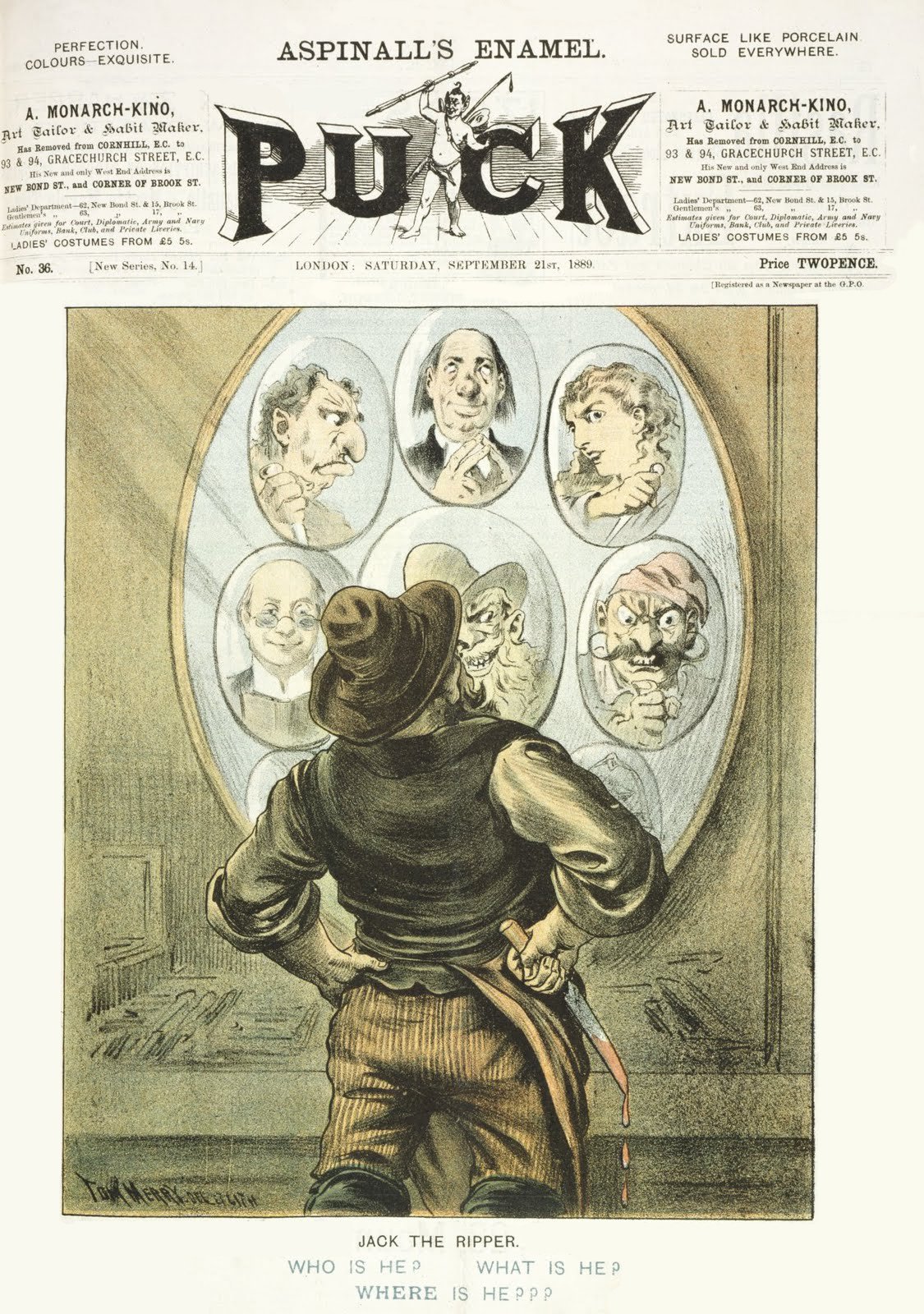
- The cover of the 21 September 1889, issue of Puck magazine, featuring cartoonist Tom Merry's depiction of the unidentified Whitechapel murderer Jack the Ripper
- Born: William Mecham; 1853
- Died: August 21, 1902 (aged 48–49)
- Other name: Tom Merry
- Occupations: Cartoonist and performer

William Mecham (1853 – 21 August 1902) was a British cartoonist and performer, taking the stage and pen name Tom Merry.

He was a professional caricaturist who gave 'Lightning Cartoon' presentations on the music hall stage, and was the first celebrity of any kind to appear in a British film.

== Cartoonist ==
William Mecham was born in the first quarter of 1853, in the parish of St Saviour, Southwark.

Merry was a cartoonist and political satirist, he created the centre spread in colour of The St Stephen's Review, a weekly magazine of political comment published from 1883 to 1892, when it became Big Ben, and closed the following year. Thirty four political lithographs, of statesmen of the era are in the collection of the House of Commons. A number of presentation (signed) copies were also in the personal collection of Winston Churchill, with his father, Lord Randolph Churchill as subject. He also published in the London edition of the American satirical Puck Magazine, from January 1889 to June 1890.

Merry's musical hall stage act appears to have involved high speed drawing of subjects drawn both from the audience, and of famous figures from memory. The caricatures were drawn at a furious pace, as can be seen in the films that survive.

== Early film ==
Birt Acres filmed four separate performances of 'Tom Merry' drawing personalities famous in his day. Films included Tom Merry Lightning Artist Drawing Mr Gladstone (1896) and Tom Merry Sketching Lord Salisbury (1896). Two further films were made, contemporaneous with Acres' films of the opening of the Kiel Canal, in June 1895. They were produced by Robert Paul and featured Merry drawing the German Emperor Kaiser Wilhelm II (1895), and Prince Bismarck (1895). They were made to be shown as a part of the same performance, but the first record of the Merry films is as part of Robert Paul's first theatrical programme at the Alhambra Theatre on 25 March 1896.

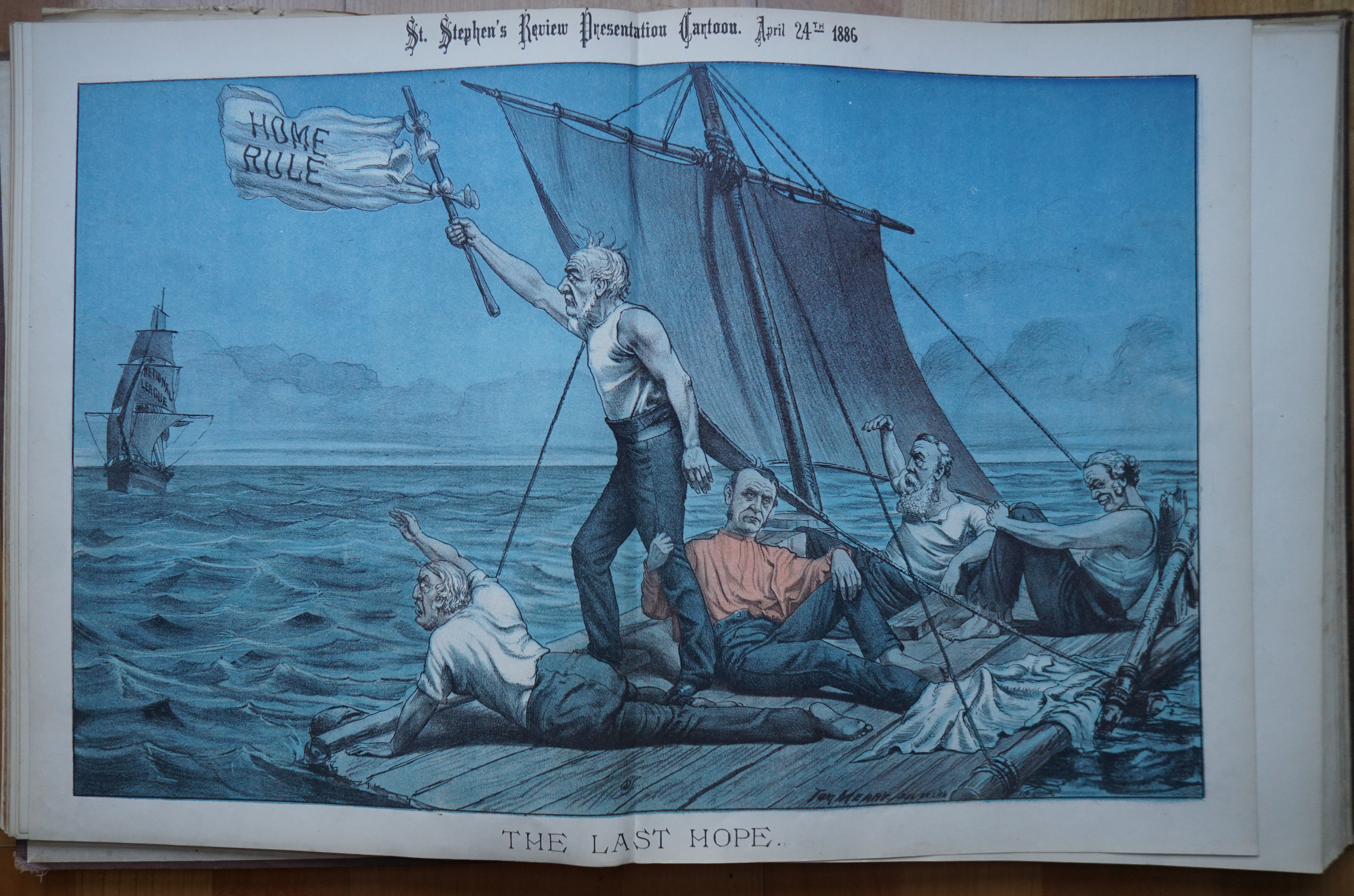
Depiction of Gladstone in St Stephen's Cartoons

The films presaged the animated cartoon. Merry could complete his caricatures in less than a minute, the practical length of the first film reels. To accommodate longer demonstrations, stop motion technology had to be developed.

== Death ==
Merry also did illustrations for a book on Canvey Island, he died before its publication, and a dedication in the book reads:

In memoriam of William Mecham, artist, cartoonist, and caricaturist, better known to the British public by his professional soubriquet, Tom Merry, who died suddenly at Benfleet Station, Essex, on Thursday, 21 August 1902, aged 49 years.

— Frontispiece dedication from History of Canvey Island Augustus Daly (1903)

=== Filmography ===
Year	Title	Role	Notes	ref
1895	Tom Merry, Lightning Cartoonist	Specialty	Short film	
1895	Tom Merry, Lightning Cartoonist II	(role unconfirmed)	Short film	
1896	Tom Merry, Lightning Cartoonist III	Specialty	Short film	
1896	Tom Merry, Lightning Cartoonist IV	Specialty	Short film	
