= Walter Price (footballer, born 1896) =

Welsh footballer

Walter Price (13 August 1896 – after 1930) was a Welsh professional footballer who played as a full back in the Football League.

Price was born in Aberdare, began his career with his local side, Aberdare Athletic, playing 36 times in their first ever season in the Football League (1921–22). He left at the end of that season to play for Pontypridd, but returned to play for Aberdare Athletic in the 1924–25 season.

However, he had played just seven games before a mid-season transfer took him to Plymouth Argyle. He remained with Argyle for six years, but made only 63 league appearances. In 1930 he joined Bristol Rovers, playing 13 league games in the 1930–31 season before ending his league career.
