= John Rogers Thomas =

American composer, pianist and singer of Welsh descent

John Rogers Thomas (March 26, 1829 – April 5, 1896) was an American composer, pianist, and singer of Welsh descent.

== Biography ==
Thomas was born in Newport, South Wales, on 26 March 1829. A baritone and composer, he first came to America with the Sequin English Opera Company and became interested in the music of America that was developing. He sang and toured with Bryant's Minstrels and settled in New York City.

He wrote more than one hundred popular American songs during the nineteenth century of which his most popular were The Cottage by the Sea (1856), Old Friends and Old Times (1856), Bonny Eloise—The Belle of Mohawk Vale (1858), 'Tis But a Little Faded Flower (1860), When the War Is Over, Mary (1864), Beautiful Isle of the Sea (1865), Croquet (1867), Eilleen Allanna (1873), and Rose of Killarney (1876). Thomas occasionally published material under the pseudonyms Charles Osborne, Arthur Percy and Harry Diamond. In addition to song writing, Thomas composed three larger works; The Picnic (1869), a children's operetta with a libretto by George Cooper; The Lady in the Mask (1870), an operetta with a libretto by George Cooper; and Diamond Cut Diamond (1876), a parlor opera in one act.

In addition to his popular songs, Thomas also composed sacred music, and was also known as a teacher in Brooklyn and in New York City, where he died on April 5, 1896.

== Songs ==
- The Cottage by the Sea (1856)
- Old Friends and Old Times (1856)
- Bonny Eloise—The Belle of Mohawk Vale (1858)
- 'Tis But a Little Faded Flower (1860)
- When the War Is Over, Mary (1864)
- Beautiful Isle of the Sea (1865)
- Croquet (1867)
- Eilleen Allanna (1873)
- Rose of Killarney (1876)
- "Annie of the Vale", words by G. P. Morris, not dated
