= Gethin Davies =

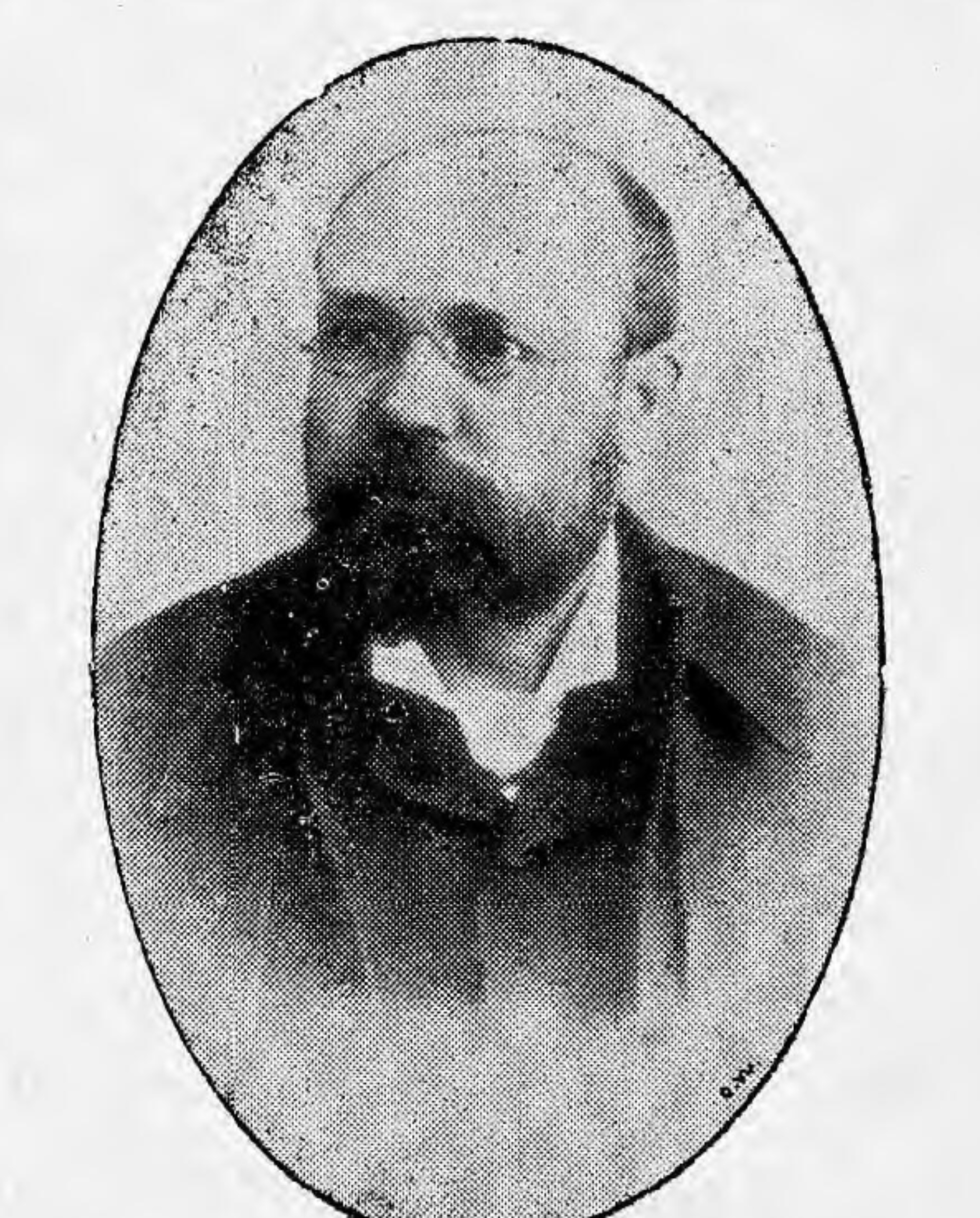
Gethin Davies, Bangor

Gethin Davies (18 September 1846 – 17 March 1896) was a Welsh Baptist minister and college principal. He was born in Aberdulais; his parents were Joseph and Catherine Davies of Glamorganshire. Gethin attended Havod British school, and served a five-year pupil-teacher apprenticeship there. In 1864 he moved to study at Graig House Academy, Swansea, and from there, in 1866, to Bristol Baptist College.

In 1872 he was appointed to the post of Classical Tutor at Llangollen Baptist College, and thence devoted himself to the task of assisting the weaker churches, and strengthening the position of the Baptist denomination in North Wales. He was also instrumental in the relocation of the Baptist College from Llangollen to Bangor (effected in 1892).

His written works (as ‘Gethin Dulais’) include contributions of verse to Welsh periodicals, and a number of Welsh hymns.

He died in London in 1896, aged 49, of cancer.
