= Film of the royal visit to the 1896 Cardiff Exhibition =

Lost piece of film by Birt Acres

The piece of film of the royal visit to the 1896 Cardiff Exhibition (known fully as H.R.H. The Prince of Wales accompanied by T.R.H. The Princess of Wales, Princess Victoria, and Princess Maud, arriving at the Cardiff Exhibition, June 27, 1896) is a British lost black-and-white documentary film produced and directed by Birt Acres on 27 June 1896 when Edward VII, his wife Alexandra, and his daughters Maud and Victoria, visited the Cardiff Industrial and Fine Art Exhibition in Cathays Park. It is considered the first film recording of the British Royal Family, one of the first British news films and the first recording set in Cardiff. The footage was recorded on 70mm negatives.

== Production ==
On 27 June 1896, the then-Prince Edward, his wife Alexandra, and his daughters Maud and Victoria, visited the Cardiff Exhibition. Birt Acres, utilizing his new Kineopticon, which had its debut at Piccadilly Mansions on March 21, 1896, secured footage of the visit on the expensive 70mm film gauge. In order to properly record the event, Acres had to drill a hole in a wall, through which the camera lens would be able to film the subjects.

The footage produced was described by a correspondent of the Cardiff Western Mail as follows:

The roadway, lined with troops, is first seen, and then Mr Robert Forrest is to be noticed walking across the foreground. Lord Windsor, in his mayoral robes, and Lady Windsor are also to be seen, and then, coming up the road, are shown the escort of Yeonmary and the carriages containing the Royal party. They are seen to alight, and are received by the mayor, when they move towards the Exhibition, and at this interesting point a 'Western Mail' representative, note-book in hand, is seen to rush across the road, but just as the audience is beginning to like him the series of photographs ends.

== Exhibition ==
Despite recording the event without the Royal Family's permission, Birt Acres requested the Prince's authorization to show the film to the public, which resulted in the filmmaker being invited to screen it, and other films, at the Malborough House. The event, which happened on 21 July 1896, is considered to be the first Royal Film Performance. Around 40 guests were present, and among the many films shown, the Cardiff Exhibition film was so popular that the audience requested it to be projected twice. Acres was assisted by Cecil M. Hepworth, who was operating the arc-lamp used in the Kineopticon projector.

== Controversy ==
Despite its success, the film garnered some controversy from the press due to a recorded instance of the then-Prince Edward supposedly scratching his head. Acres went on public record defending the Prince, arguing that he was actually just brushing a fly away. This incident did not injure Acres' relationship with the Royal Family and they would continue to collaborate in future events, such as the wedding of Princess Maud and Prince Carl of Denmark.
