= John Ashton (composer) =

Welsh musician (1830–1896)

John Ashton (1830 – 25 December 1896) was a Welsh musician from Montgomeryshire, who had worked as a policeman and shoemaker. He wrote a number of songs and hymns, including Trefeglwys, written in 1857.

Ashton's songs were published in Miwsig y Miloedd, Caniadau y Cysegr a'r Teulu, Llyfr Tonau Cynulleidfaol, and Cerddor yr Ysgol Sabothol. He died in New Zealand, having emigrated there in 1874.
