= Dancing Girls (1896 film) =

1896 British film directed by Birt Acres

- Directed by: Birt Acres
- Release date: 1896
- Country: United Kingdom
- Language: Silent

Dancing Girls is an 1896 British short black-and-white silent film directed and produced by Birt Acres.
