= Landing at Low Tide =

1896 film by Birt Acres

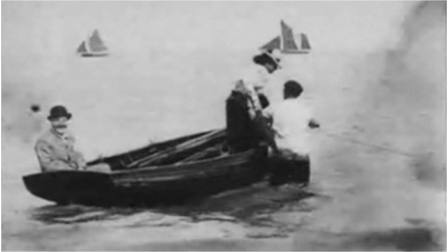
- Screenshot from the film
- Directed by: Birt Acres
- Produced by: Birt Acres; Robert W. Paul
- Cinematography: Birt Acres
- Release date: June 1896
- Country: United Kingdom
- Language: Silent

Landing at Low Tide is an 1896 British short black-and-white silent comedy film, produced and directed by Birt Acres for exhibition on Robert W. Paul's peep show Kinetoscopes, featuring a lady falling into the water as she is helped from a small boat. The film was considered lost until footage from an 1896 Fairground Programme, originally shown in a portable booth at Hull Fair by Midlands photographer George Williams, donated to the National Fairground Archive was identified as being from this film.

== Current status ==
Given its age, this short film is available to freely download from the Internet. However, the only digital copy available online, under the responsibility of the National Fairground and Circus Archive, can only be viewed upon a direct request to the institute, which will be subject to prior evaluation.
