= Blackfriars Bridge (film) =

1896 British film by Robert W. Paul

- Directed by: Robert W. Paul
- Produced by: Robert W. Paul
- Cinematography: Robert W. Paul
- Production company: Paul's Animatograph Works
- Release date: August 1896
- Running time: 36 seconds
- Country: United Kingdom
- Language: Silent

Blackfriars Bridge (AKA: Traffic on Blackfriars Bridge) is an 1896 British short black-and-white silent actuality film, directed by Robert W. Paul, featuring top-hatted pedestrians and horse-drawn carriages passing over Blackfriars Bridge, London. The film was, according to Michael Brooke of BFI Screenonline, "taken from the southern end looking northwards over the Thames by R.W. Paul in July 1896," and, "screened as part of his Alhambra Theatre programme shortly afterwards, certainly no later than 31 August"
