= Killing of Robert Kidd =

British police officer killed in the line of duty

Robert Kidd
- Born: 17 December 1857; Westmorland
- Died: 29 September 1895 (aged 37); Wigan, (then Lancashire), England
- Cause of death: Homicide by Stabbing
- Known for: Death in the line of duty
- Spouse: Ellen Taplin (m. 1882)
- Police career
- Country: United Kingdom
- Department: London & North Western Railway Police
- Service years: 1885–1895
- Rank: Police Sergeant

On 29 September 1895, 37-year-old English Police Sergeant Robert Kidd was killed near Wigan northwestern station, (then Lancashire), England while investing railway thefts. Kidd and a fellow officer were responding to a number of reports of thefts at the goods yard adjacent to the station. He was fatally injured by a knife. In December 1895, two men, Elijah Winstanley and William Kearsley, were found guilty of manslaughter and received the death sentence. One was later commuted to penal servitude for life and one was hanged.

== See also ==
- List of British police officers killed in the line of duty
