= Alexandre Promio =

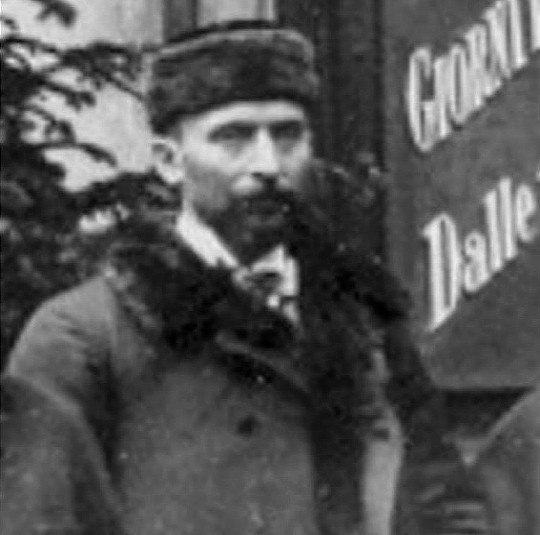
- Alexandre Promio
- Occupation: Film director
- Known for: international work for Auguste and Louis Lumière

Jean Alexandre Louis Promio (9 July 1868 – 24 December 1926) was a French cinematographer and director. He is mentioned as a pioneer in film and was the director of Sweden's first newsreel, featuring King Oscar II's arrival at the General Art and Industrial Exposition on 15 May 1897.

Chicago, grande roue, Promio's 1896 film of the original Ferris Wheel, is one of the earliest films of Chicago.

Panorama du Grand Canal vu d'un bateau (1896) is most likely the first film to be made with a moving camera.

Alexandre Promio came from an Italian family that moved to France and resided in Lyon. During his time as an assistant to an optician in Lyon, he witnessed the first presentation of the medium of moving pictures cinematograph. Promio was interested in the art of photography, and in March 1896 left his work at the optician to start working for Auguste and Louis Lumière. He soon became head of the film unit and got the responsibility for the education of the first cinematograph-operators.

His first assignment was to present and market the new medium of film worldwide. Promio visited several cities between April 1896 and September 1897. He first went to Madrid, where he demonstrated moving pictures on 13 May 1896. On 7 July he did a film demonstration for the Tsar Nikolaj II of Russia and the empress of Saint Petersburg, after that he visited England, Germany and Hungary. In September 1896, he arrived in the US, and filmed the first films of Chicago. In Italy, he on 25 October 1896 filmed the city of Venice from a Gondola. The film had its premiere on 13 December 1897 in Lyon under the title of Panorama du Grand Canal vu d'un bateau which shows the short trip of Canal Grande. It was most likely the world's first moving film, also the first being filmed by a moving camera.

He ceased traveling in 1898 and resided permanently in Lyon, continuing in the employ of the Lumière brothers. In 1907 he filmed for Pathé, and between 1914 and 1915 he was a soldier in World War I. After the war he became a still photographer and cinematographer to the Algerian government, creating some 3,000 photographs and 38 documentary films. He returned to France due to illness, and resided in Asnières-sur-Seine near Paris. He died at his home on Christmas Eve 1926, although his death was not announced until four months later.

== Promio in Sweden ==
In Lumière's work concept was showing cinematography not only for the public but also for royalty and other prominent people. And as a treat the royal family got to see themselves on the "white screen" in film taken by Promio earlier in the day.

This happened in Stockholm as well when he visited for two weeks during the summer of 1897 to show Lumières invention at the General Art and Industrial Exposition of Stockholm. At one point Promio also educated Sweden's first film photographer Ernest Florman who himself had contributed with several films for the exhibition. On 15 May 1897 Promio filmed the first ever Swedish newsreel film which showed the King Oscar II along with the crown prince Gustaf V as they arrived at the exhibition area at Djurgården. The king got to see the film the same day. While in Sweden Promio also made Sweden's first feature film, Slagsmål i Gamla Stockholm, which was one minute long.
