= Rough Sea at Dover =

- Full film
- Directed by: Birt Acres
- Produced by: Birt Acres; Robert W. Paul
- Cinematography: Birt Acres
- Release date: 14 January 1896
- Running time: 39 seconds
- Country: United Kingdom
- Language: Silent

Rough Sea at Dover (also known as Gale at Dover and Sea Waves at Dover) is an 1895 British short black-and-white silent film, shot by Birt Acres.

Acres shot the film in mid-1895, with a camera designed with and built by Robert W. Paul, their original intention being to supply films for viewing in the Edison kinetoscope. Projected, the film premiered on 14 January 1896 when Acres showed it to the Royal Photographic Society in Hanover Street, London, using his "Kinetic Lantern", along with various other films made during the period Acres was working with Paul. Acres had screened some of these films (but not this film) to the Lyonsdown Photographic Society a few days before, on 10 January 1896, just two weeks after the first public screening by the Lumière Brothers in Paris. Following its successful screening in London the film was taken to the United States where it was shown on 23 April 1896 at Koster and Bial's Music Hall in New York City with a series of American movies made by the Edison's company.

Despite its simple nature, Rough Sea at Dover became one of the most popular and widely screened early British films.

== Content ==
The film consists of two distinct shots of different locations which have been edited together. It is not possible to tell with certainty whether these were edited together in the original release version. The first shot is of the rough sea as heavy waves crash against Admiralty Pier in Dover. The second shot is from a different location along a riverbank showing a view of fast-flowing water. It has been speculated that this second half of the footage has been taken from Niagara Falls No. 1: The Upper River Just Above The Falls, a film made by Acres late in 1895.

== Current status ==
Given its age, this short film is available to view or download. It has also featured in a number of film collections, such as Primitives and Pioneers.
