= The Oxford and Cambridge University Boat Race (film) =

- Directed by: Birt Acres
- Produced by: Birt Acres; Robert W. Paul
- Cinematography: Birt Acres
- Release date: 1895
- Country: United Kingdom
- Language: Silent

The Oxford and Cambridge University Boat Race is an 1895 British short black-and-white silent documentary film directed and produced by Birt Acres. It was filmed on 30 March 1895.

This film became the first in the UK to be commercially screened outside London and was displayed at Cardiff Town Hall on 5 May 1896.

== Content ==
The film consists of a simple shot (approximately one minute or less) of the 1895 edition of the Oxford versus Cambridge University Boat Race.
