= Birt Acres =

American and British photographer and film pioneer (1854-1918)

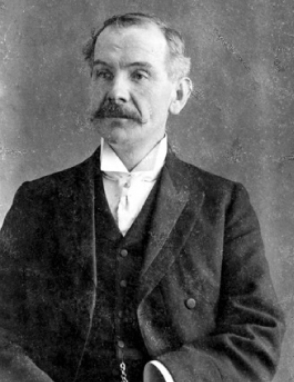
- Born: 23 July 1854; Richmond, Virginia, United States
- Died: 27 December 1918 (aged 64); Whitechapel, London, England
- Occupation: Cinematographer

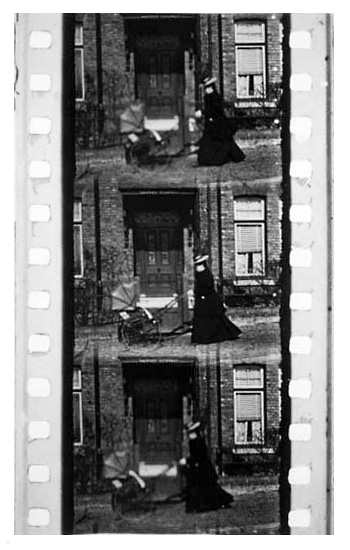
Frames from Incident at Clovelly Cottage, 1895.

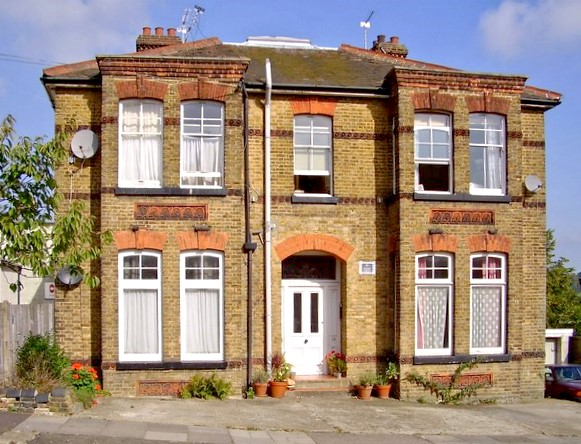
Clovelly Cottage, 19 Park Road, Chipping Barnet.

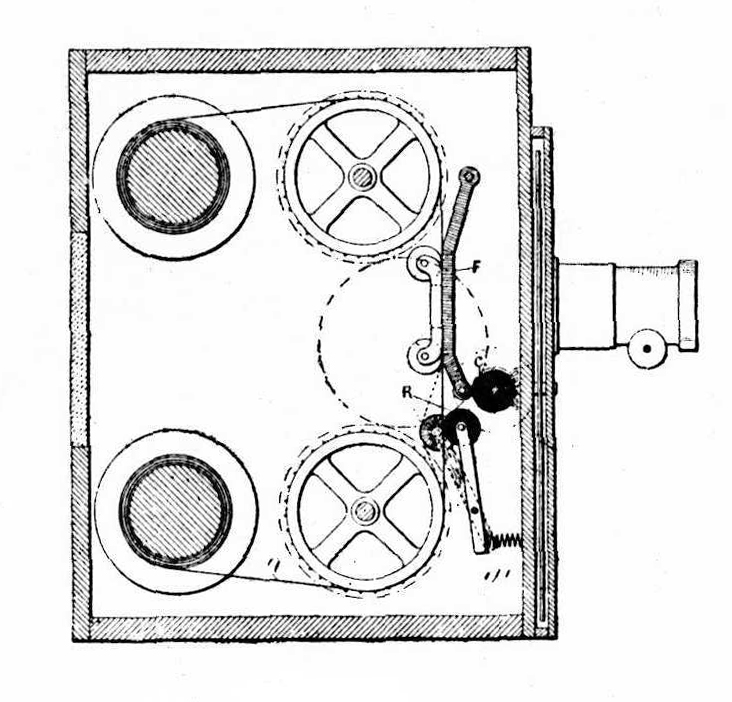
Birt Acres' Kinetic Camera, 1895.

Birt Acres (23 July 1854 – 27 December 1918) was an American and British photographer and film pioneer. Among his contributions to the early film industry are the first working 35 mm camera in Britain (Wales), and Birtac, the first daylight loading home movie camera and projector. He also directed a number of early silent films.

== Early life ==
Born in Richmond, Virginia, on 23 July 1854, to English parents. He became an orphan at the age of 14, during the American Civil War and was raised by an aunt.

== Career ==
Acres invented the first British 35 mm moving picture camera, Birtac which was the first daylight loading home movie camera and projector; he was also the first travelling newsreel reporter in international film history and the first European film maker who had his films shown in the United States in public performances. He contributed much to the introduction and development of cinematography in all its aspects, from the construction of cameras, projectors, film viewers, coating and slitting machines and the manufacture of highly sensitized 35 mm raw film stock, to mobile newsreel reporting and the public projections of moving pictures.

With his partner Robert W. Paul, he was the first person to build and run a working 35 mm camera in Britain. Incident at Clovelly Cottage was made in March 1895 and featured Acres' wife with their infant son in a pram outside Acres' then home of Clovelly Cottage, Park Road, Chipping Barnet, which still exists. Acres and Paul fell out after Acres patented their design in his own name on 27 May 1895. He made some very early silent films during the Victorian era including in 1895: a film of the Oxford and Cambridge Boat Race, The Arrest of a Pickpocket, The Comic Shoeblack, The Boxing Kangaroo and Performing Bears.

On 10 January 1896, he gave a display of moving pictures to the Lyonsdown Photographic Society at the Lytton Road Assembly Rooms in New Barnet. This was the first public film show to an audience in the United Kingdom.

Acres was a Fellow of the Royal Photographic Society. On 14 January 1896, he demonstrated his Kineopticon system to members and wives of the Society, at the Queen's Hall in London. Robert Paul's first solo theatrical programme was at the Alhambra Theatre on 25 March 1896.

== Death ==
Acres died on 27 December 1918 in Whitechapel, London and is buried in Walthamstow (Queens Road) Cemetery, London.

== Most important achievements ==
- 1889 Apparatus for washing prints (patented).
- 1891 Printing process for stereoscopic photographs (for continuously contact print making) (patented).
- 1893 Hopper feed installation for rapidly projecting slides in a biunial (two-in-one) lantern to create the illusion of movement (patented).
- 1895 Kinetic Camera with appliance for loop forming (patented).
- 1895/96 Electroscope, apparatus for continuous viewing by more than one spectator of 35mm film.
- 1896 Installation for wholesale production of raw stock 35 mm film.
- 1896 Kineopticon, improved apparatus for projecting 35 mm film (patented).
- 1897 Cine camera with 2 lenses to resolve flicker problems and to enhance brightness.
- 1898 Birtac, home movie camera for daylight loading of 17.5 mm film (patented).

== Filmography ==
Date	Title	Role	Notes
1895	Incident at Clovelly Cottage	Director	"the first successful motion picture film made in Britain"
1895	The Arrest of a Pickpocket	Director	
1895	Charge of the Uhlans	Director, Producer	
1895	Crude Set Drama	Director, Producer	
1895	The Derby	Director, Cinematographer, Producer	
1895	The German Emperor Reviewing His Troops	Director	aka Kaiser Wilhelm Reviewing His Troops (USA)
1895	Opening of the Kiel Canal	Director, Cinematographer, Producer	aka Inauguration of the Kiel Canal by Kaiser Wilhelm II (UK)
1895	The Oxford and Cambridge University Boat Race	Director, Cinematographer, Producer	
1895	Performing Animals; or, Skipping Dogs	Director, Cinematographer, Producer	
1895	Rough Sea at Dover	Director, Cinematographer, Producer	
1895	Shoeblack at Work in a London Street	Director	
1895	Smith and Machinery at Work	Director, Cinematographer, Producer	
1895	Tom Merry, Lightning Cartoonist	Director, Cinematographer, Producer	aka Tom Merry, Lightning Cartoonist, Sketching Kaiser Wilhelm II (four films were made of Tom Merry drawing notable figures, the others were Lord Salisbury (1896), William Ewart Gladstone (1896) and Bismarck (1895))
1896	The Boxing Kangaroo	Director	
1896	Boxing Match; or, Glove Contest	Director	
1896	Dancing Girls	Director	
1896	Golfing Extraordinary, Five Gentl	Director	
1896	Landing at Low Tide	Director	
1896	Pierrot and Pierrette	Director	
1896	A Surrey Garden	Director	
1896	Royal visit to the Cardiff Industrial and Fine Art Exhibition	Director, Cinematographer	aka H.R.H. The Prince of Wales accompanied by T.R.H. The Princess of Wales, Princess Victoria, and Princess Maud, arriving at the Cardiff Exhibition, June 27th, 1896. Newsreel coverage of the Prince and Princess of Wales' visit of the 1896 Cardiff Exhibition. Now a lost film, it's considered the first time the British Royal Family was filmed.
1896	Yarmouth Fishing Boats Leaving Harbour	Director	
1897	Henley Regatta	Director	
1897	An Unfriendly Call	Director	
1900	Briton vs. Boer	Producer	
