= List of horror films of the 1910s =

This is a list of horror films released in the 1910s.

== List ==
Horror films released in the 1910s
Title	Director	Cast	Country	Subgenre/notes
1910
Frankenstein	J. Searle Dawley	Augustus Phillips, Mary Fuller, Charles Ogle	United States	Short film
1911
L'Inferno	Francesco Bertolini, Adolfo Padovan, Giuseppe De Liguoro	Salvatore Papa, Arturo Pirovano, Giuseppe de Liguoro, Augusto Milla	Italy	first full-length Italian feature film
1912
Dr. Jekyll and Mr. Hyde	Lucius Henderson	James Cruze	United States	Short film
Le Système du Docteur Goudron et du Professeur Plume	Maurice Tourneur	Henri Gouget, Henry Roussel, Renée Sylvaire	France	Short film, lost film, silent film Alternative titles Also known as The System of Doctor Goudron
Trilby (1912 film)	Anton Kolm Luise Fleck Jacob Fleck	Elsa Galafrés	Austrian	Potentially Lost
The Mask of Horror	Abel Gance	Édouard de Max	France	Short film
The Spider's Web	Van Dyke Brooke, Maurice Costello	Charles Eldridge, Earle Williams, Hal Wilson	United States	Short film
1913
Dr. Jekyll and Mr. Hyde	Herbert Brenon	King Baggot, Jane Gail, Matt Snyder, Howard Crampton	United States	Short film
The Student of Prague	Stellan Rye, Paul Wegener	Paul Wegener, John Gottowt	German Empire	
The Skull	William V. Ranous	Florence Turner, Leo Delaney, Edwin R. Phillips	United States	Short film
The Werewolf	Henry McRae		United States	Short film, lost film
1914
Der Hund von Baskerville	Rudolf Meinert	Alwin Neuß Friedrich Kühne Hanni Weisse	German	-
The Ghost Breaker (1914 film)	Cecil B. DeMille Oscar Apfel	H. B. Warner Theodore Roberts Jode Mullally Horace B. Carpenter	American	Lost Film
The Avenging Conscience	D.W. Griffith		United States	
Figures de cire	Maurice Tourneur		France	Short film
1915
Rapsodia Satanica	Nino Oxilia	Lyda Borelli Andrea Habay	Italian	
After Death (1915 film)	Yevgeni Bauer	Vitold Polonsky Vera Karalli Mariya Khalatova	Russian	
Het geheim van het slot arco	Maurits Binger Jan van Dommelen	Jan van Dommelen Willem van der Veer Caroline van Dommelen	Dutch	Lost Film
Der Golem	Paul Wegener, Henrik Galeen	Paul Wegener, Carl Ebert	German Empire	Lost film Alternative titles Also known as Der Golem, The Monster of Fate
The Haunting Fear	Robert G. Vignola	Alice Hollister, Henry Hallam, Anna Q. Nilsson	United States	Short film
Life Without Soul	Joseph W. Smiley	Percy Standing, Lucy Cotton, Pauline Curley	United States	Lost film
1916
Snow White (1916 film)	J. Searle Dawley	Marguerite Clark Creighton Hale Dorothy Cumming	American	
The Crimson Stain Mystery	T. Hayes Hunter	Maurice Costello, Ethel Grandin	United States	Film serial
Hævnens nat	Benjamin Christensen	Peter Fjelstrup, Charles Wilken, Karen Caspersen	Denmark	
A Night of Horror	Richard Oswald, Arthur Robison		German Empire	Silent film
Das Phantom der Oper	Ernst Matray	Nils Chrisander, Aud Egede-Nissen	German Empire	Silent film, lost film
1917
The Brand of Satan	George Archainbaud	Montagu Love Gerda Holmes Evelyn Greeley	American	
Malombra (1917 film)	Carmine Gallone	Lyda Borelli Amleto Novelli Giulia Cassini Rizzotto	Italian	
Black Orchids (film)	Rex Ingram (director)	Cleo Madison Francis McDonald Dick La Reno	American	Lost Film
Fear	Robert Wiene	Bruno Decarli, Conrad Veidt	German Empire	
Der Golem und die Tänzerin	Rochus Gliese, Paul Wegener	Paul Wegener, Lyda Salmonova	German Empire	Alternative titles Also known as The Golem and the Dancing Girl
1918
The Bells (1918 film)	Ernest C. Warde	Frank Keenan Lois Wilson (actress) Edward Coxen	American	Lost film
The Craving (1918 film)	Francis Ford (actor) John Ford	Francis Ford (actor) Duke Worne Jean Hathaway	American	
Die Augen der Mumie Ma	Ernst Lubitsch	Pola Negri Emil Jannings Harry Liedtke	German	
Alraune	Michael Curtiz, Fritz Odon	Rozsi Szollosi, Guyla Gál	Hungary; Austria	Lost film
1919
The Dance of Death (1919 film)	Otto Rippert	Werner Krauss Sascha Gura Fred Goebel	German	lost film
The Ancestress	Jacob Fleck Luise Fleck	Liane Haid Max Neufeld Karl Ehmann	Austrian	
Madness (1919 film)	Conrad Veidt	Conrad Veidt Reinhold Schünzel Grit Hegesa	German	Lost film
J'accuse (1919 film)	Abel Gance	Romuald Joubé Maxime Desjardins Maryse Dauvray	French	
The Haunted Bedroom	Fred Niblo	Enid Bennett Dorcas Matthews Jack Nelson (actor)	American	Lost film
The Beetle	Alexander Butler	Maudie Dunham, Hebden Foster, Fred Morgan	United Kingdom	
The Plague of Florence	Otto Rippert	Theodor Becker, Karl Bernhard, Julietta Brandt	Germany	
Unheimliche Geschichten	Richard Oswald	Anita Berber, Conrad Veidt	Germany	Alternative titles Also known as Tales of the Uncanny, Five Sinister Stories, Tales of Horror

== See also ==
- Lists of horror films
