= List of horror films of the 1900s =

This is a list of horror films released in the 1900s.

== List ==
Horror films released in the 1900s
Title	Director	Cast	Country	Subgenre/notes
1900
Faust and Marguerite	Edwin S. Porter	Edwin S. Porter	United States	Short film
The Devil in a Convent	Georges Méliès	Georges Méliès	France	Fantasy, Short film
The Prince of Darkness			United States	Short film
Uncle Josh in a Spooky Hotel	Edwin S. Porter	Charles Manley	France	Comedy, Short film
Chinese Magic (Yellow Peril)	Walter R. Booth	Walter R. Booth	United Kingdom	Short film
1901
Bluebeard	Georges Méliès	Georges Méliès, Jeanne d'Alcy, Bleuette Bernon	France	Short film
The Haunted Curiosity Shop	Walter R. Booth	Walter R. Booth	United Kingdom	Short film
Le Diable géant ou Le miracle de la madonne (The Devil and the Statue)	Georges Méliès	Georges Méliès	France	Short film
1902
Les Trésors de Satan	Georges Méliès	Georges Méliès	France	Short film
Les sept châteaux du diable	Ferdinand Zecca		France	Short film
1903
Le Monstre	Georges Méliès	Georges Méliès	France	Short film
Le Chaudron Infernal (The Infernal Boiling Pot)	Georges Méliès	Georges Méliès	France	Short film
Le Cake-walk infernal (The Infernal Cake Walk)	Georges Méliès	Georges Méliès	France	Short film
The Ghost Train				Short film
Faust et Méphistophélès	Alice Guy-Blanché			Short film
1905
Le Diable Noir (The Black Imp)	Georges Méliès	Georges Méliès	France	Short film
L'antre infernal	Gaston Velle		France	Short film
1906
La Maison hantée	Segundo de Chomón	Julienne Mathieu	France	Short film
Les Quatre cents farces du diable(The Merry Frolics of Satan)	Georges Méliès	Georges Méliès	France	Short film
1907
The Doll's Revenge	Cecil M. Hepworth	Gertie Potter, Bertie Potter	United Kingdom	Black Comedy, Short film
The Haunted Hotel	J. Stuart Blackton	Paul Panzer, William V. Ranous	United States	Short film
Satan s'amuse (Satan at Play)	Segundo de Chomón	Julienne Mathieu	France	Short film
Le spectre rouge	Segundo de Chomón	Julienne Mathieu	France	Short film
1908
The Doctor's Experiment			France	Sci-Fi, Short film
Dr. Jekyll and Mr. Hyde	Otis Turner	Hobart Bosworth, Betty Harte	United States	Short film
Le château hanté	Segundo de Chomón		France	Short film
Il conte Ugolino	Giuseppe de Liguoro	Giuseppe de Liguoro	Italy	Short film
L'hôtel hanté	Segundo de Chomón		France	Short film
Yurei Kagami	Kichizo Chiba	Nobuchika Nakano	Japan	Short film
La légende du fantôme	Segundo de Chomón	Julienne Mathieu	France	Short film
1909
Bake Yanagi		Ryutaro Ichiza Matsudaira	Japan	Short film
Cuore di mamma	Luigi Maggi	Mary Cleo Tarlarini, Mirra Principi, Eugenia Torrielli	Italy	Fantasy, Short film
Une excursion incohérente	Segundo de Chomón		France	Dark Fantasy, Short film
L'homme-singe	Georges Monca	André Deed	France	Sci-Fi, Short film
Kasane miuri koroshiba		Kasen Nakamura all-girl troupe	Japan	Short film
Le manoir ensorcelé			France	Short film
Sugawara tenjin-ki	Shōzō Makino	Tadashi Ichino, Komaume	Japan	Short film
Viy	Vasili Goncharov	I. Langfeld, A. Platonov, V. Dalskaya	Russia	Short film

== See also ==
- Lists of horror films
