= Tricks of Love =

- Directed by: Maurice Tourneur
- Written by: Robert Boudrioz
- Starring: Renée Sylvaire
- Production company: Société Française des Films Éclair
- Release date: 1913
- Country: France
- Languages: Silent; French intertitles

Tricks of Love (French: Les ruses de l'amour) is a 1913 French silent comedy film directed by Maurice Tourneur and starring Renée Sylvaire.

== Bibliography ==
- Waldman, Harry. Maurice Tourneur: The Life and Films. McFarland, 2001.
