= The Sparrow (1914 film) =

- Directed by: Maurice Tourneur
- Written by: Maurice Tourneur
- Production company: Société Française des Films Éclair
- Distributed by: Société Française des Films Éclair
- Release date: 1914
- Country: France
- Languages: Silent; French intertitles

The Sparrow (French: Le Friquet) is a 1914 French silent film directed by Maurice Tourneur.

== Cast ==
- Polaire as Le Friquet
- Henry Roussel
- Renée Sylvaire
- Caesar as Mafflu

== Bibliography ==
- Waldman, Harry. Maurice Tourneur: The Life and Films. McFarland, 2001.
