= 1902 in film =

The year 1902 in film involved some significant events.

== Events ==
- March 10 – A Circuit Court decision in the United States ends Thomas Edison's monopoly on the 35 mm movie film technology.
- April 2 – Thomas Lincoln Tally opens the Electric Theater, the first permanent movie theater, in Los Angeles. Tally co-founds the First National Exhibitors Circuit in 1917.
- August 9 – Georges Méliès' film The Coronation of Edward VII (a staged simulation with inserted actuality footage) is first shown in London on the evening of the Coronation itself.
- September 1 – actor/producer Méliès premières the first science fiction film, the silent A Trip to the Moon (Le Voyage dans La Lune), at the Théâtre Robert-Houdin in Paris, France; it proves an immediate success. One scene features the animated human face of the Moon being struck in the eye by a rocket.
- William Wardell invents an 11 mm amateur film format, Vitak.

== Notable films ==
=== A ===
- Ali Baba and the Forty Thieves (Ali Baba et les quarante voleurs), directed by Ferdinand Zecca, based on the Middle-Eastern folk tale – (France)

=== B ===
- Bradford Coronation Procession, produced by Mitchell and Kenyon – (UK)
- Burnley v. Manchester United, produced by Mitchell and Kenyon – (UK)

=== C ===
- Comic Pictures in High Street, West Bromwich, produced by Mitchell and Kenyon – (UK)
- The Coronation of Edward VII (Le Sacre d'Édouard VII), directed by Georges Méliès – (France)

=== D ===
- Dewsbury v. Manningham, produced by Mitchell and Kenyon – (UK)

=== E ===
- Electric Tram Rides from Forster Square, Bradford, produced by Mitchell and Kenyon – (UK)
- Employees Leaving Storey's Moor Lane Mill, Lancaster, produced by Mitchell and Kenyon – (UK)

=== F ===
- Fun in a Bakery Shop, directed by Edwin S. Porter – (US)

=== G ===
- The Great Local Derby: Accrington v. Church, Cricket Match, produced by Mitchell and Kenyon – (UK)
- Gulliver's Travels Among the Lilliputians and the Giants (Le Voyage de Gulliver à Lilliput et chez les Géants), directed by Georges Méliès, based on the 1726 novel by Jonathan Swift – (France)

=== J ===
- Jack and the Beanstalk, directed by Edwin S. Porter, based on the 1807 fairy tale by Benjamin Tabart – (US)

=== L ===
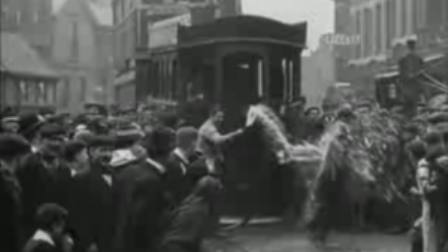
Screenshot from the film Living Wigan.

- Leeds Athletic and Cycling Club Carnival, produced by Mitchell and Kenyon – (UK)
- Lieutenant Clive Wilson and the Tranby Croft Party, Hull, produced by Mitchell and Kenyon – (UK)
- The Little Match Seller, directed by James Williamson, based on the 1845 fairy tale The Little Match Girl by Hans Christian Andersen – (UK)
- Le prince de Galles, a documentary short film about Edward, Prince of Wales directed by Louis Lumière – (France)
- Living Wigan, produced by Mitchell and Kenyon – (UK)

=== Q ===
- Quo Vadis?, directed by Ferdinand Zecca and Lucien Nonguet – (France)

=== R ===
- Ringling Brothers Parade Film, produced by William Selig – (US)
- Robinson Crusoe (Les aventures de Robinson Crusoë), directed by Georges Méliès, based on the 1719 novel by Daniel Defoe – (France)

=== S ===
- Sheffield United v. Bury, produced by Mitchell and Kenyon – (UK)
- Snow White, produced by Siegmund Lubin, based on the 1812 fairy tale by the Brothers Grimm – (US)
- Street Scenes in Halifax, produced by Mitchell and Kenyon – (UK)

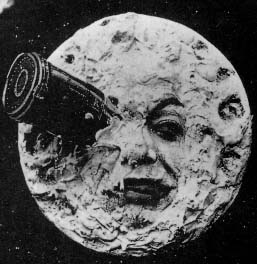
Man in the Moon scene.

=== T ===
- Tram Ride into Halifax, produced by Mitchell and Kenyon – (UK)
- The Treasures of Satan (Les Trésors de Satan), directed by Georges Méliès – (France)
- A Trip to the Moon (Le Voyage dans la Lune), directed by Georges Méliès, based on the 1865 novel From the Earth to the Moon by Jules Verne – (France)

=== W ===
- Wexford Bull Ring, produced by Mitchell and Kenyon – (UK)
- Workers Leaving the Jute Works, Barrow, produced by Mitchell and Kenyon – (UK)
- Working Rotary Snow Plows, produced by Edison Studios – (US)

== Births ==
Thelma Ritter.

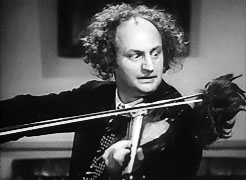
Larry Fine.

Month	Date	Name	Country	Profession	Died
January	2	Sybil Seely	US	Actress	1984
January	11	Atang de la Rama	Philippines	Actress, singer	1991
January	31	Tallulah Bankhead	US	Actress	1968
February	3	Dolly Rudeman	Indonesia	Poster Designer	1980
February	8	Lyle Talbot	US	Actor	1996
February	14	Thelma Ritter	US	Actress	1969
March	8	Louise Beavers	US	Actress	1962
March	8	Onslow Stevens	US	Actor	1977
March	23	Philip Ober	US	Actor	1982
March	27	Kenneth Macpherson	Scotland	Filmmaker	1971
March	28	Flora Robson	UK	Actress	1984
April	25	Mary Miles Minter	US	Actress	1984
May	2	Brian Aherne	UK	Actor	1986
May	3	Jack La Rue	US	Actor	1984
May	3	Walter Slezak	Austria	Actor	1983
May	4	Mona Mårtenson	Sweden	Actress	1956
May	6	Max Ophüls	Germany	Director	1957
May	10	David O. Selznick	US	Producer, screenwriter, Studio Executive	1965
May	21	Anatole Litvak	Russia	Filmmaker	1974
May	28	Luis César Amadori	Italy	Director, screenwriter	1977
May	30	Stepin Fetchit	US	Actor, comedian	1985
June	5	Walter Plunkett	US	Costume Designer	1982
June	22	Marguerite De La Motte	US	Actress	1950
July	1	William Wyler	Germany	Director, producer	1981
July	4	George Murphy	US	Actor, dancer, Politician	1992
July	17	Edward Gargan	US	Actor	1964
July	18	Dimitar Panov	Bulgaria	Actor, director	1985
July	18	Chill Wills	US	Actor, singer	1978
August	7	Ann Harding	US	Actress	1981
August	10	Norma Shearer	Canada	Actress	1983
August	10	Curt Siodmak	Poland	Screenwriter	2000
August	11	Lloyd Nolan	US	Actor	1985
August	22	Leni Riefenstahl	Germany	Director, Photographer, Actress	2003
September	3	Mantan Moreland	US	Actor, comedian	1973
September	5	Darryl F. Zanuck	US	Producer, Studio Executive	1979
September	17	Esther Ralston	US	Actress	1994
September	22	John Houseman	Romania	Actor, producer	1988
October	5	Larry Fine	US	Actor, comedian, Musician	1975
October	17	Irene Ryan	US	Actress, Comedienne	1973
October	18	Miriam Hopkins	US	Actress	1972
October	28	Jenny Gilbertson	Scotland	Documentary Filmmaker	1990
October	28	Elsa Lanchester	UK	Actress	1986
November	4	Victor Jory	Canada	Actor	1982
November	23	John P. Fulton	US	Special Effects Supervisor, Cinematographer	1966
December	1	Harold Goodwin	US	Actor	1987
December	5	Emeric Pressburger	UK	Screenwriter, Film director	1988
December	9	Margaret Hamilton	US	Actress	1985
December	14	Frances Bavier	US	Actress	1989
December	19	Barton MacLane	US	Actor, Playwright, Screenwriter	1969
December	19	Ralph Richardson	UK	Actor	1983

== Deaths ==
- February 15 – Wilhelmina J. R. Albregt-Engelman, Dutch actress (born 1834)
