= The Secret of the Well =

- Directed by: Maurice Tourneur
- Written by: Pierre Sales (novel)
- Production company: Société Française des Films Éclair
- Release date: 27 February 1914
- Country: France
- Languages: Silent; French intertitles

The Secret of the Well (French: Le puits mitoyen) is a 1914 French silent film directed by Maurice Tourneur.

== Cast ==
- Henry Roussel
- Renée Sylvaire
- Manzoni
- Sohège

== Bibliography ==
- Waldman, Harry. Maurice Tourneur: The Life and Films. McFarland, 2001.
