= The Seashell and the Clergyman =

1928 experimental French film

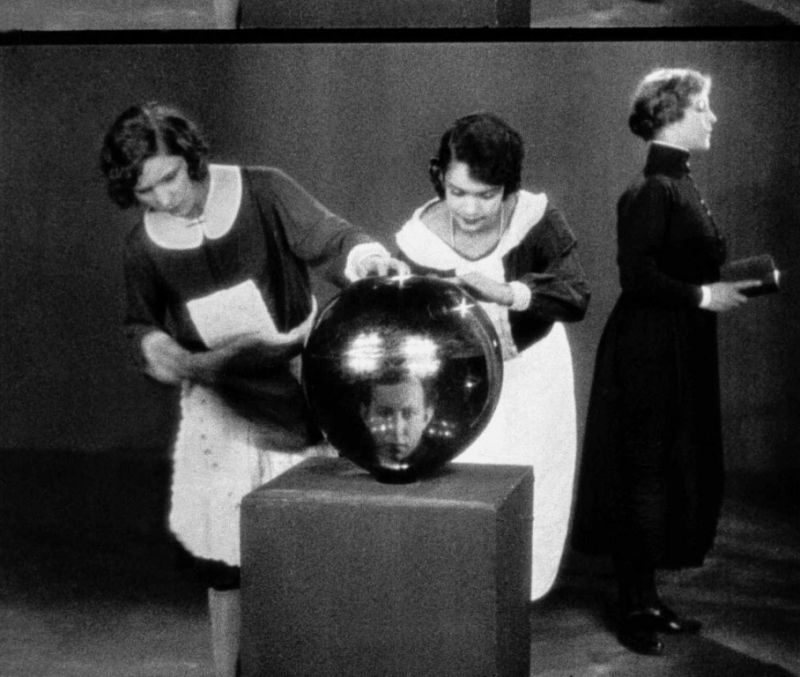
- Film still
- French: La Coquille et le Clergyman
- Directed by: Germaine Dulac
- Release date: 9 February 1928
- Running time: 40 minutes
- Country: France

The Seashell and the Clergyman (French: La Coquille et le Clergyman) is a 1928 French experimental film directed by Germaine Dulac, from an original scenario by Antonin Artaud. It premiered in Paris on 9 February 1928. The film is associated with French Surrealism.

== Synopsis ==
The Seashell and the Clergyman (1928)

The film follows the erotic hallucinations of a priest lusting after the wife of a general.

== Reception and legacy ==
Although accounts differ, it seems that Artaud disapproved of Dulac's treatment of his scenario. The film was overshadowed by Un chien andalou (An Andalusian Dog, 1929), written by Luis Buñuel and Salvador Dalí and directed by Buñuel. Un chien andalou is considered the first surrealist film, but its foundations in The Seashell and the Clergyman have been all but overlooked. However, the iconic techniques associated with surrealist cinema are all borrowed from this early film. In Lee Jamieson's analysis of the film, the surrealist treatment of the image is clear. He writes:

The Seashell and the Clergyman penetrates the skin of material reality and plunges the viewer into an unstable landscape where the image cannot be trusted. Remarkably, Artaud not only subverts the physical, surface image, but also its interconnection with other images. The result is a complex, multi-layered film, so semiotically unstable that images dissolve into one another both visually and 'semantically', truly investing in film's ability to act upon the subconscious.

The British Board of Film Censors famously reported that the film was "so cryptic as to be almost meaningless. If there is a meaning, it is doubtless objectionable".

Alan Williams has suggested the film is better thought of as a work of or influenced by German expressionism.

The British Film Institute included The Seashell and the Clergyman on a list of 10 Great Feminist Films, stating:

Germaine Dulac was involved in the avant garde in Paris in the 1920s. Both The Smiling Madame Beudet (1922) and The Seashell and the Clergyman are important early examples of radical experimental feminist filmmaking, and provide an antidote to the art made by the surrealist brotherhood. The latter film, an interpretation of Anton [sic] Artaud’s book of the same name, is a visually imaginative critique of patriarchy – state and church – and of male sexuality. On its premiere, the surrealists greeted it with noisy derision, calling Dulac "une vache".

== Musical scores ==
The film, originally silent, was one of the first films scored by Silent Orchestra and performed by them at the National Museum of Women in the Arts in Washington, DC in 2000. This was the first film to be scored by live accompaniment band Minima. Their debut performance was at the UK's Shunt Vaults at London Bridge in 2006. It has also been rescored by Steven Severin of Siouxsie and the Banshees and The Black Cat Orchestra.

For the 2005 Kino International DVD collection Avant-garde: experimental cinema of the 1920s and '30s, the guitarist Larry Marotta provided the film's soundtrack.

Sons of Noel and Adrian performed a live score at The Roundhouse in June 2009. In March 2011, Imogen Heap performed an acappella score of her own composition with the Holst Singers as part of the Birds Eye View festival.

In January 2012, a new score to a director's cut of The Seashell and the Clergyman was released by the artist Roto Visage on Kikapu.

In 2015 an electronic soundtrack was composed by Luigi Morleo for the Film Silence Music Festival in Italy.

A new score by Sheffield musicians In the Nursery was performed live to accompany a showing of the film on 9 June 2019 and released on CD on 25 October 2019.

== Cast ==
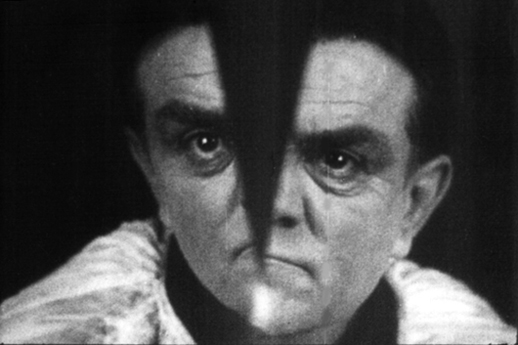
Lucien Bataille as the general

- Alex Allin as The clergyman
- Genica Athanasiou as the General's wife
- Lucien Bataille as the General

== Home media ==
- Avant-garde: Experimental Cinema of the 1920s and '30s – DVD collection which includes The Seashell and the Clergyman

== Bibliography ==
- Wendy Dozoretz, Germaine Dulac : Filmmaker, Polemicist, Theoretician, (New York University Dissertation, 1982), 362 pp.
- Charles Henri Ford, Germaine Dulac : 1882 - 1942, Paris : Avant-Scène du Cinéma, 1968, 48 p. (Serie: Anthologie du cinéma; 31)
