= Arquette =

Arquette is a surname. Notable people with the surname include:

- Alexis Arquette (1969–2016), American transgender actress
- Cliff Arquette (1905–1974), American actor, father of Lewis
- David Arquette (born 1971), American actor
- Lewis Arquette (1935–2001), American actor, father of Alexis, David, Patricia, Richmond and Rosanna
- Patricia Arquette (born 1968), American actress
- Rosanna Arquette (born 1959), American actress

== See also ==
- Arcouët
