= Lucile (film) =

1927 film

- Directed by: Georges Monca
- Starring: Maryse Dauvray; Georges Gauthier; Jean Lorette
- Release date: 1927
- Running time: 75 minutes
- Country: France
- Languages: Silent; French intertitles

Lucile is a 1927 French silent drama film directed by Georges Monca and starring Maryse Dauvray, Georges Gauthier and Jean Lorette.

== Cast ==
- Maryse Dauvray
- Georges Gauthier
- Jean Lorette
- Georges Térof
- Gabrielle Robinne

== Bibliography ==
- Jay Robert Nash, Robert Connelly & Stanley Ralph Ross. Motion Picture Guide Silent Film 1910-1936. Cinebooks, 1988.
