= List of American films of 1902 =

A list of American films released in 1902.

Title	Director	Cast	Genre	Notes
Appointment by Telephone	Edwin S. Porter		Comedy short	
Arrival of Prince Henry (of Prussia) and President Roosevelt at Shooter's Island (1902)			News short	
Babies Rolling Eggs	Edwin S. Porter		Documentary short	
The Bull and the Picnickers	Edwin S. Porter		Comedy short	
The Burlesque Suicide, No. 2	George S. Fleming, Edwin S. Porter			
Burning of Durland's Riding Academy	Edwin S. Porter		Documentary short	
Burning of St. Pierre [Martinique]	Edwin S. Porter		Documentary short	
Capture of the Biddle Brothers	Edwin S. Porter		Drama short	
Charleston Chain-Gang	Edwin S. Porter		Documentary short	
Chinese Shaving Scene	Edwin S. Porter		Documentary short	
Fun in a Bakery Shop	Edwin S. Porter		Comedy short	
The Girls in the Overalls	Harry Buckwalter		Documentary short	
The Golden Chariots	Edwin S. Porter		Documentary short	
Great Bull Fight	Edwin S. Porter		Documentary short	
Happy Hooligan Turns Burglar			Comedy short	
How They Do Things on the Bowery	Edwin S. Porter		Drama short	
The Interrupted Bathers	George S. Fleming, Edwin S. Porter		Comedy short	
Jack and the Beanstalk	George S. Fleming, Edwin S. Porter			
Who Said Watermelon?			Comedy short	
Snow White	Siegmund Lubin			
The Twentieth Century Tramp; or, Happy Hooligan and His Airship	Edwin S. Porter	J. Stuart Blackton	Comedy short	
Uncle Josh at the Moving Picture Show	Edwin S. Porter	Charles Manley	Comedy short	

== See also ==
- AFI Catalog of Feature Films
- 1902 in the United States
