= List of horror films of the 1920s =

A list of horror films released in the 1920s.

== List ==
Horror films released in the 1920s
| Title | Director | Cast | Country | Notes |
1920
| Anita | Jacob Fleck, Luise Fleck | Lola Urban-Kneidinger, Wilhelm Klitsch, Julius Strobl | Austria | |
| The Dream Cheater | Ernest C. Warde | J. Warren Kerrigan Wedgwood Nowell Joseph J. Dowling | United States | |
| Desire (1920 film) | - | Dennis Neilson-Terry Yvonne Arnaud George W. Anson | United Kingdom | |
| The House of Whispers | Ernest C. Warde | J. Warren Kerrigan Joseph J. Dowling Fritzi Brunette | United States | Lost film |
| Der Graf von Cagliostro | Reinhold Schünzel | Reinhold Schünzel Anita Berber Conrad Veidt | Austrian | Lost film |
| Love Without Question | B. A. Rolfe | Olive Tell James W. Morrison Mario Majeroni | American | Lost film |
| The Dark Mirror (1920 film) | Charles Giblyn | Dorothy Dalton Huntley Gordon Jessie Arnold | American | |
| The Hunchback and the Dancer | F. W. Murnau | Sascha Gura John Gottowt Paul Biensfeldt | Germany | Lost film |
| The Cabinet of Dr. Caligari | Robert Wiene | Werner Krauss, Conrad Veidt | Germany | |
| Dr. Jekyll and Mr. Hyde | John S. Robertson | John Barrymore, Martha Mansfield | United States | |
| Dr. Jekyll and Mr. Hyde | J. Charles Haydon | Sheldon Lewis | United States | |
| Genuine | Robert Wiene | Fern Andra, Hans Heinrich von Twardowski | Germany | |
| The Golem: How He Came into the World | Paul Wegener, Carl Boese | Paul Wegener, Albert Steinrück | Germany | |
| The Head of Janus | F. W. Murnau | Conrad Veidt, Bela Lugosi | Germany | Lost film |
| The Penalty | Wallace Worsley, Sr. | Lon Chaney, Claire Adams | United States | |
| From Morn to Midnight | Karlheinz Martin | Ernst Deutsch, Roma Bahn, Erna Morena | Germany | |
| The Monster of Frankenstein | Eugenio Testa | Umberto Guarracino | Italy | Lost film |
1921
| Das grinsende Gesicht | Julius Herska | Anna Kallina Nora Gregor Franz Höbling | Austria | |
| Destiny | Fritz Lang | Lil Dagover, Bernard Goetzke, Walter Janssen | Germany | |
| Dracula's Death | Ka'roly Lajthay | Erik Vanko, Lene Myl | Hungary | Lost film |
| Labyrinth of Horror | Michael Curtiz | Lucy Doraine Alfons Fryland Max Devrient | Austria | |
| The Arrival from the Darkness | Jan S. Kolár | Theodor Pištěk (actor) Anny Ondra Karel Lamač | Czechoslovakia | |
| The Haunted Castle | F. W. Murnau | Arnold Korft, Lothar Mehnert | Germany | |
| The Phantom Carriage | Victor Sjöström | Victor Sjöström, Hilda Borgström | Sweden | |
1922
| A Blind Bargain | Wallace Worsley, Sr. | Lon Chaney, Raymond McKee, Jacqueline Logan, Fontaine La Rue | United States | Lost film |
| The Ghost Breaker | Alfred Green | Wallace Reid, Lila Lee, Walter Hiers | United States | Lost film |
| Häxan | Benjamin Christensen | Benjamin Christensen, Clara Pontoppidan | Sweden | |
| The Headless Horseman | Edward D. Venturini | Will Rogers, Ben Hendricks, Lois Meredith | United States | |
| Nosferatu | F. W. Murnau | Max Schreck, Gustav von Wangenheim, Greta Schröder | Germany | |
| One Exciting Night | D. W. Griffith | Carol Dempster, Henry Hull, Morgan Wallace | United States | |
1923
| The Hunchback of Notre Dame | Wallace Worsley | Lon Chaney, Patsy Ruth Miller, Norman Kerry | United States | |
| The Last Moment | J. Parker Read | Henry Hull, Doris Kenyon, Louis Wolheim | United States | |
| Old Baron of Rautakylä | Carl Fager | Einar Rinne, Adolf Lindfors, Naimi Kari | Finland | |
| While Paris Sleeps | Maurice Tourneur | Lon Chaney, Mildred Manning | United States | |
1924
| Dante's Inferno | Henry Otto | Pauline Starke, Ralph Lewis, Josef Swickard, Gloria Grey | United States | |
| The Hands of Orlac | Robert Wiene | Conrad Veidt, Alexandra Sorina | Germany; Austria | |
| Waxworks | Paul Leni | Werner Krauss, Conrad Veidt, Emil Jannings, William Dieterle | Germany | |
1925
| The Monster | Roland West | Lon Chaney, Johnny Arthur, Gertrude Olmstead | United States | |
| The Phantom of the Opera | Rupert Julian | Lon Chaney, Mary Philbin, Norman Kerry | United States | |
| Wolfblood: A Tale of the Forest | George Chesebro, Bruce M. Mitchell | Marguerite Clayton, Ray Hanford | United States | |
1926
| A Page of Madness | Teinosuke Kinugasa | Masou Inoue, Ayako Iijima | Japan | |
| The Bat | Roland West | Jack Pickford, Louise Fazenda | United States | |
| The Bells | James Young | Lionel Barrymore, Boris Karloff | United States | |
| Faust – Eine deutsche Volkssage | F. W. Murnau | Emil Jannings, Yvette Guilbert, Gösta Ekman | Germany | |
| Maciste all'inferno | Guido Brignone | Bartolomeo Pagano, Franz Sala, Pauline Polaire | Italy | |
| The Magician | Rex Ingram | Alice Terry, Paul Wegener | United States | |
| The Student of Prague | Henrik Galeen | Conrad Veidt, Werner Krauss, Agnes Esterhazy | Germany | |
1927
| The Cat and the Canary | Paul Leni | Laura La Plante, Creighton Hale | United States | |
| The Gorilla | Alfred Santell | Charlie Murray, Fred Kelsey, Alice Day | United States | Lost film |
| London After Midnight | Tod Browning | Lon Chaney, Marceline Day | United States | Known in the UK as The Hypnotist Lost film |
| The Unknown | Tod Browning | Lon Chaney, Norman Kerry, Joan Crawford | United States | |
| The Wizard | Richard Rosson | Edmond Lowe | United States | Lost film |
1928
| Alraune | Henrik Galeen | Brigitte Helm, Paul Wegener | Germany | |
| The Ape | Beverly C. Rule | Gladys Walton, Ruth Stonehouse, Basil Wilson, Bradley Barke | United States | |
| The Fall of the House of Usher | Jean Epstein | Jean Debucourt, Marguerite Gance | France | |
| The Fall of the House of Usher | James Sibley Watson, Melville Webber | Herbert Stern, Hildegarde Watson | United States | |
| The Terror | Roy Del Ruth | May McAvoy, Louise Fazenda, Edward Everett Horton | United States | |
| The Man Who Laughs | Paul Leni | Mary Philbin, Conrad Veidt | United States | |
| The Last Warning | Paul Leni | Laura La Plante, Montagu Love | United States | |

== See also ==
- Lists of horror films
