= Gender Crisis =

2021 German silent dramatic comedy film

Gender Crisis [Geschlechterkrise] is a 2021 German silent dramatic comedy film directed by Malte Wirtz. The film has an 80-minute run time. The story is based on the tale of Samson and Delilah from the Hebrew Bible.

== Plot ==
Samson (played by Rostyslav Bome) is a strong, handsome man living in the city who everyone wants to be friends with. Samson has magical powers, which are stored in his hair. However, people soon figure out where his power lies, and they try to steal it.

One day, while Samson is sleeping, two people cut off his hair. One of them, De (played by Taisiya Schumacher), eats it, thus stealing Samson's power.

One sunny afternoon De meets two mimes (played by Maximilian Gehrlinger and Freya Kreutzkam) who she asks to tell her fortune. She is told she will gain happiness, but in order to do so she must commit crimes. De then faints and wakes up a little later.

De's powers now open up a whole new world of power for her. She is now seductive and wanted by all, but she has an urge to murder.

== Cast ==
Full cast:

- Rostyslav Bome - Samson
- Taisiya Schumacher - De ("Of")
- Keziban Inal - Lilah
- Jesse Albert - Der zuspäte Haarabschneider ("The Old Haircutter")
- Hans Bayer - Der Warner ("The Warner")
- Anna-Maria Böhm - Die Frau am Fluss ("The Woman by the River")
- Eric Carter - Der Spassmacher ("The Jester")
- Daniel Christensen - Der Mann mit grauem Hut ("The Man with the Gray Hat")
- Philipp Eckelmann - Der Betrogene ("The Deceived")
- Nadja Felk - Die Frau mit Hut ("The Woman with the Hat")
- Raphael Fülöp - Der Vater ("The Father")
- Maximilian Gehrlinger and Freya Kreutzkam - Der Pantomime ("The Mime")
- Alice Gruia - Die Frau mit Pelz ("The Woman with Fur")
- Manuel Harder - Der Mann mit schwarzem Hut ("The Man with a Black Hat")
- Tim-Fabian Hoffmann - Der Mann mit Schal ("The Man with a Scarf")
- Yotam Ishay and Laura Schuhrk - Der Liebende im Park ("The Lover in the Park")
- Timo Jacobs - Don Gigi
- Sophie Reichert - Die Verlassene ("The Abandoned")
- Alec Rosenthal - Der Haarabschneider ("The Haircutter")
- Moritz A. Sachs - Der Scherenschnittmann ("The Sillouette Man")
- Dominic Saleh-Zaki - Der Mann am Dach ("The Man on the Roof")
- Judith Shoemaker - Die Selbstfrisörin ("The Self Hairdresser")
- Frederik von Lüttichau - Der Getötete ("The Slain Man")'
- Nikolai Will - Der Mann an der Bushaltestelle ("The Man at the Bus Stop")
- Jonathan Wirtz - Das Kind ("The Child")

== Production ==
The movie was filmed over 17 days in Berlin and North Rhine-Westphalia in Germany.

The film's cinematography was done by Antje Heidemann and Francisco de la Torre, with music composed by Wilhelm Friedmann. Malte Wirtz did all the editing for the film.

The film was produced under the Unfiltered Artists production company.

== Reception ==
The film was released on September 16, 2021, in selected German cinemas. It received generally positive reviews.
