= Maryse Dauvray =

French film actress

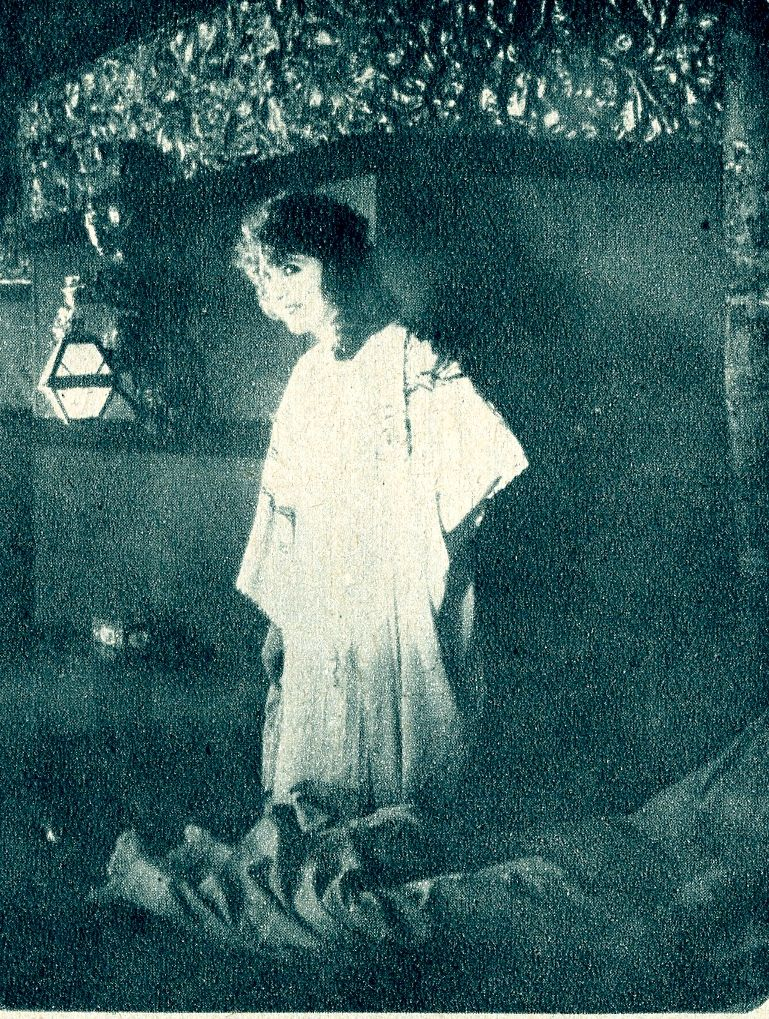
- Maryse Dauvray in La fiamma sacra (1922)
- Occupation: Actress
- Years active: 1909–1927 (film)

Maryse Dauvray was a French film actress of the silent era.

== Selected filmography ==
- The Red Promenade (1914)
- Sharks (1917)
- J'accuse (1919)
- Lucile (1927)

== Bibliography ==
- Waldman, Harry. Maurice Tourneur: The Life and Films. McFarland, 2001.
