= 1920s in film =

The 1920s were a transformative decade in film history, marked by the rise of feature-length productions and major technological things.

== Events ==
The 1920s saw a vast expansion of Hollywood film making and worldwide film attendance. Throughout the decade, film production increasingly focused on the feature film rather than the "short" or "two-reeler." This is a change that had begun with works like the long D. W. Griffith epics of the mid-1910s and became the primary style by the 1920s. In Hollywood, numerous small studios were taken over and made a part of larger studios, creating the studio system that would dominate American filmmaking until the 1960s. Metro-Goldwyn-Mayer (founded in the middle of the decade) and Paramount Pictures were the highest-grossing studios during the period, with 20th Century Fox, Universal Pictures, United Artists, and Warner Brothers making up a large part of the remaining market.

The 1920s were also the decade of the "Picture Palaces": large urban theaters that could seat 1–2,000 guests at a time, with full orchestral accompaniment and very decorative design (often a mix of Italian, Spanish, and Baroque styles). These picture palaces were often owned by the film studios and used to premier and first-run their major films.

Key genres such as the swashbuckler, horror, and modern romantic comedy flourished during the decade. Stars such as Douglas Fairbanks, Ramon Novarro, Pola Negri, Nazimova, Greta Garbo, Mary Pickford, Lillian Gish, Francis X. Bushman, Charlie Chaplin, Buster Keaton, Harold Lloyd, Lon Chaney, Rudolph Valentino, John Gilbert, Clara Bow, Gloria Swanson, Joan Crawford, George O'Brien, and John Barrymore created some of their most memorable roles and films during the period.

Stylistically, the influence of German Expressionism, Soviet Montage Editing, and realism made profound aesthetic changes to film over the course of the decade. A more artistic approach to composition on the screen shifted filmmaking away from its earlier obsession with showing the world "as it is." By the mid-to-late-1920s, the silent "art film" was on the rise with some of the greatest silent film achievements, such as Josef von Sternberg's Underworld and The Last Command, King Vidor's The Crowd, and F. W. Murnau's Sunrise: A Song of Two Humans. Erich von Stroheim's ultra-realist films such as Greed also had a big influence.

The transition to sound-on-film technology occurred mid-decade with the talkies developed in 1926–1927, following experimental techniques begun in the late 1910s. The 1926 Scottish release Till the Bells Ring featured spoken parts and synchronised sound throughout. Fox Studios and the Warner Brothers were crucial in the development and acceptance of the technology of sound in motion pictures. The concept of the musical appeared immediately, as in The Jazz Singer of 1927, because silent films had been accompanied by music for years when projected in theaters. Sound also transformed Hollywood storytelling, shifting focus toward dialogue and reducing reliance on purely visual expression.

Also, in 1927, the International Academy of Motion Picture Arts and Sciences was formed. Later, "International" was removed from the name. Today the Academy of Motion Picture Arts and Sciences, is most famous for its annual presentation of the Academy Awards, also known as the "Oscars."

== Lists of films ==
- 1920 in film
- 1921 in film
- 1922 in film
- 1923 in film
- 1924 in film
- 1925 in film
- 1926 in film
- 1927 in film
- 1928 in film
- 1929 in film

== See also ==
- Film, History of film, Lists of films
