= 1900s in film =

List of years in film
- … 1890; 1891; 1892; 1893; 1894; 1895; 1896; 1897; 1898; 1899; 1900; 1901; 1902; 1903; 1904; 1905; 1906; 1907; 1908; 1909; 1910 …
- In television 1897 1898 1899 1900 1901 1902 1903
- Art; Archaeology; Architecture; Literature; Music; Philosophy; Science; +...

The decade of the 1900s in film involved some significant films.

== Events ==
Several full-length films were produced during the 1900s (decade).

== Lists of films ==
- Early Television
- 1900 in film
- 1901 in film
- 1902 in film
- 1903 in film
- 1904 in film
- 1905 in film
- 1906 in film
- 1907 in film
- 1908 in film
- 1909 in film

== See also ==
- Film
- History of film
- Lists of films
