= List of horror films =

This is a list of lists of horror films. Often there may be considerable overlap particularly between horror and other genres (including action, thriller, and science fiction films).

== Before 1960 ==
- List of horror films of the 1890s
- List of horror films of the 1900s
- List of horror films of the 1910s
- List of horror films of the 1920s
- List of horror films of the 1930s
- List of horror films of the 1940s
- List of horror films of the 1950s

== 1960–present ==
- 1960
- 1961
- 1962
- 1963
- 1964
- 1965
- 1966
- 1967
- 1968
- 1969
- 1970
- 1971
- 1972
- 1973
- 1974
- 1975
- 1976
- 1977
- 1978
- 1979
- 1980
- 1981
- 1982
- 1983
- 1984
- 1985
- 1986
- 1987
- 1988
- 1989
- 1990
- 1991
- 1992
- 1993
- 1994
- 1995
- 1996
- 1997
- 1998
- 1999
- 2000
- 2001
- 2002
- 2003
- 2004
- 2005
- 2006
- 2007
- 2008
- 2009
- 2010
- 2011
- 2012
- 2013
- 2014
- 2015
- 2016
- 2017
- 2018
- 2019
- 2020
- 2021
- 2022
- 2023
- 2024
- 2025
- 2026

== By setting ==
- List of horror films set in academic institutions
- List of holiday horror films

== By subgenre ==
- List of analog horror media
- List of eco-horror films
- List of comedy horror films
- List of science fiction horror films
- List of natural horror films

=== By creature ===
- List of ghost films
- List of vampire films
- List of zombie films
- List of monster movies
- List of films featuring giant monsters

== Other ==
- List of highest-grossing horror films
- List of World War II horror films

== See also ==
- List of horror anthology films
- Lists of horror film characters
- List of mystery films
- List of thriller films
- List of films considered the worst
- Vampire movies
- Werewolf films
- Zombie films
- Splatter film
- Cannibal film
- Snuff film
