= The Red Promenade =

- Directed by: Maurice Tourneur
- Written by: Pierre Sales (novel); Maurice Tourneur
- Starring: Maryse Dauvray; Henry Roussel
- Production company: Société Française des Films Éclair
- Release date: 2 July 1914
- Running time: 37 minutes
- Country: France
- Languages: Silent; French intertitles

The Red Promenade (French:Le corso rouge) is a 1914 French silent drama film directed by Maurice Tourneur and starring Henry Roussel, Renée Sylvaire and Charles Keppens.

== Cast ==
- Henry Roussel as Montenervio
- Renée Sylvaire
- Charles Keppens as Hélier de Saint-Ermont
- Georges Paulais
- Maryse Dauvray
- Maïna as L'écuyère de cirque
- Madeleine Grandjean as Henriette de St. Ermont

== Bibliography ==
- Waldman, Harry. Maurice Tourneur: The Life and Films. McFarland, 2001.
