= Snow White (1902 film) =

- Produced by: Siegmund Lubin
- Release date: July 1902
- Country: United States
- Language: Silent film

Snow White is a silent movie made in 1902. It was the first time the classic 1812 Brothers Grimm fairy tale was made into a film.
