= Sanguivorous (film) =

Japanese avant-garde horror film

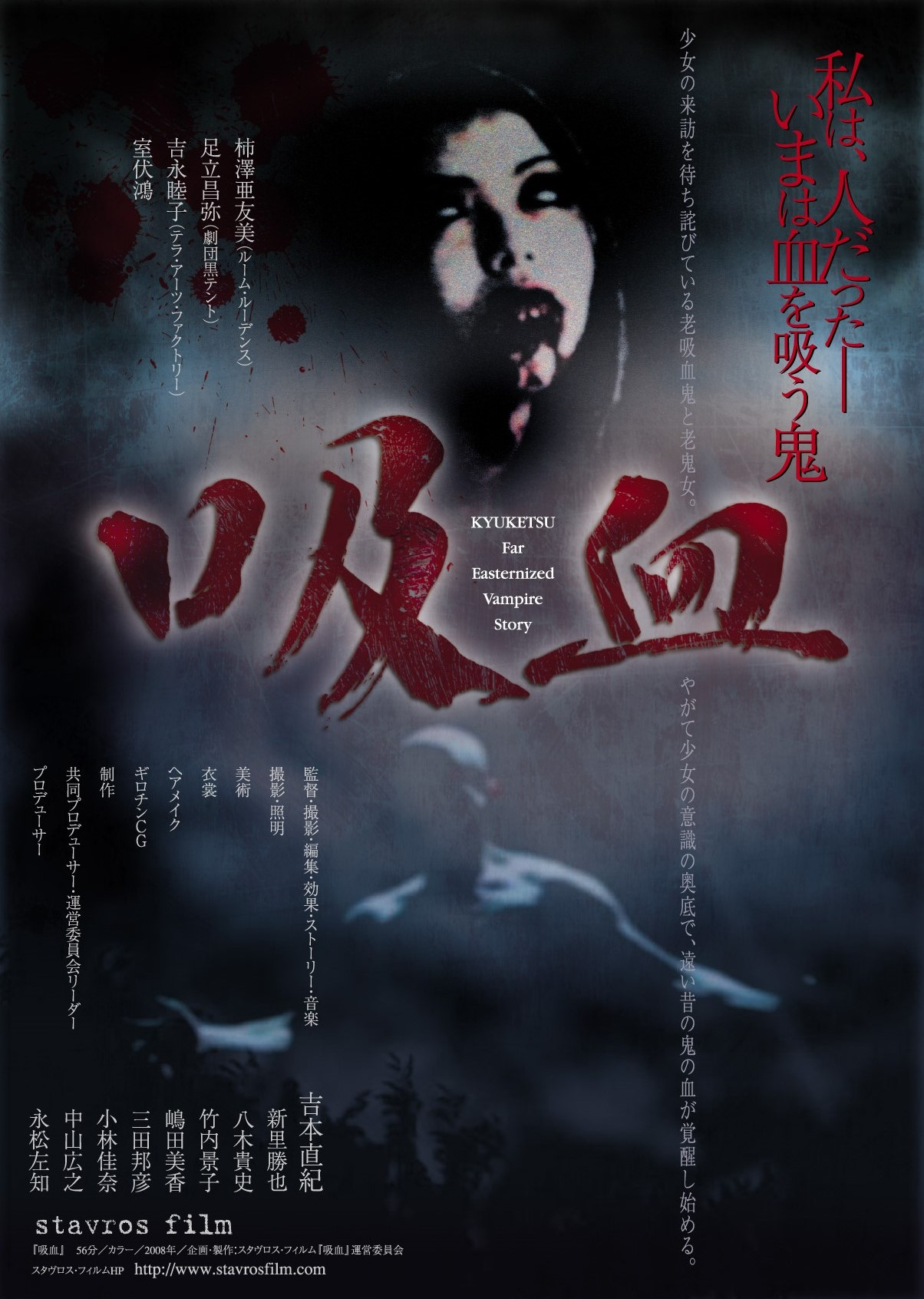
The most commonly used promotional poster for Kyuketsu.

Sanguivorous [吸血, "Kyuketsu"] is a 2011 Japanese avant-garde horror film written and directed by Naoki Yoshimoto and produced by Sachi Nagamatsu. The film is in black and white and is mostly silent.

== Etymology ==
The word "sanguivorous" (pronounced saŋˈgwiv(ə)rəs) means "a creature that feeds on blood. The word is Latin in origin, coming from the words "sanguis," which means "blood," and "vorous," which means "feeding on" or "devouring."

== Plot ==
A young woman (played by Ayumi Kakizawa) suffering from mysterious physical ailments. Her boyfriend tells her the story of a vampire who moved to Japan and created a generation of vampires who are waiting to have their vampiric blood aroused by the loss of their virginity. The main actress is heavily implied to be one of these vampires, and she begins being haunted by a vampire (played by Ko Murobushi) while trying to cope with her vampiric urges.

== Production ==
Choreography for the film was done by Ko Murobushi, a traditional Butoh actor. The cinematography and lighting was done by Katsuya Shinzato and Mitsuyo Watanabe. Naoki Yoshimoto helped with most aspects of the production.

== Cast ==
- Ayumi Kakizawa - Young Woman
- Masaya Adachi - Boyfriend
- Ko Murobushi - Vampire
- Mutsuko Yoshinaga - Unknown

== Reception ==
The film was shown at the Krannert Art Museum in October 2011 with live music by Tatsuya Nakahani, a percussionist, and Edward Wilkerson, a saxophonist.

The film was released on blu-ray on November 19, 2013 by Tidepoint Pictures.
