= The Treasures of Satan =

- Directed by: Georges Méliès
- Starring: Georges Méliès
- Production company: Star Film Company
- Release date: 1902
- Country: France
- Language: Silent

Les Trésors de Satan, released in the United States as The Treasures of Satan and in Britain as The Devil's Money Bags, is a 1902 French silent trick film directed by Georges Méliès. It was released by Méliès's Star Film Company and is numbered 413–414 in its catalogs.

== Plot ==
In a room in a medieval castle, Satan examines six money bags, and then locks them in a large chest. A blond man, creeping into the room on his hands and knees, jumps towards the table where he expects to find the money bags. Realizing the money is in the chest, he forces it open, but the lid slams down on his fingers. When he opens it again, the money bags are jumping and frolicking of their own accord. The man slams the lid down and sits on it, but he falls off when six young women in devilish outfits emerge one by one from the chest. They transform the money bags into spears and chase the man around the room; when the man tries to take refuge in the chest, it magically changes position. The women disappear, but the chest itself comes to life before transforming into a demon and tormenting the man. Satan and the demon throw the man in the safe, and they and the women dance around it as fire and smoke issue from it. Finally, the safe explodes to reveal the original money bags, safe and sound.

== Production ==
Méliès appears in the film as the blond man. The set for the film, somewhat reminiscent of a Gustave Doré background, reveals Méliès's detailed knowledge of medieval architecture. Similar Doré-like medieval scenery can also be found in other Méliès films, such as The Astronomer's Dream (1898) and The Tower of London (1905). The key in the film was built on an unrealistically large scale to allow it to be seen clearly, a device similar to that of the insert in modern filmmaking. The film's special effects were created using stage machinery (to make the money bags dance), pyrotechnics, and substitution splices.

Because the film is silent and contains no intertitles, the details of its plot are difficult to decipher. In his book-length study of Méliès, John Frazer suggests that the film involves money belonging to Satan, and that the blond-wigged character played by Méliès is a thief. By contrast, a 1905 American catalog produced by the Star Film Company claims that the blond character is the miser who owns both the money bags and the castle where the film is set, and that Satan has secretly made his way into the castle to meddle with the money unexpectedly. However, the catalog also claims that there are seven bags of gold and seven demon women, a numbering not borne out by the film itself.

== Themes and reception ==
The film is one of several Méliès works in which the character of Satan demonstrates what the film historian Richard Abel characterizes as "a playfully devilish power", allowing Méliès to subvert and satirize French social values with carnival-like abandon. Other Méliès films with similarly rebellious themes and Satanic characters include The Devil in a Convent, The Infernal Cauldron, and The Infernal Cake Walk.
