= Ringling Brothers Parade Film =

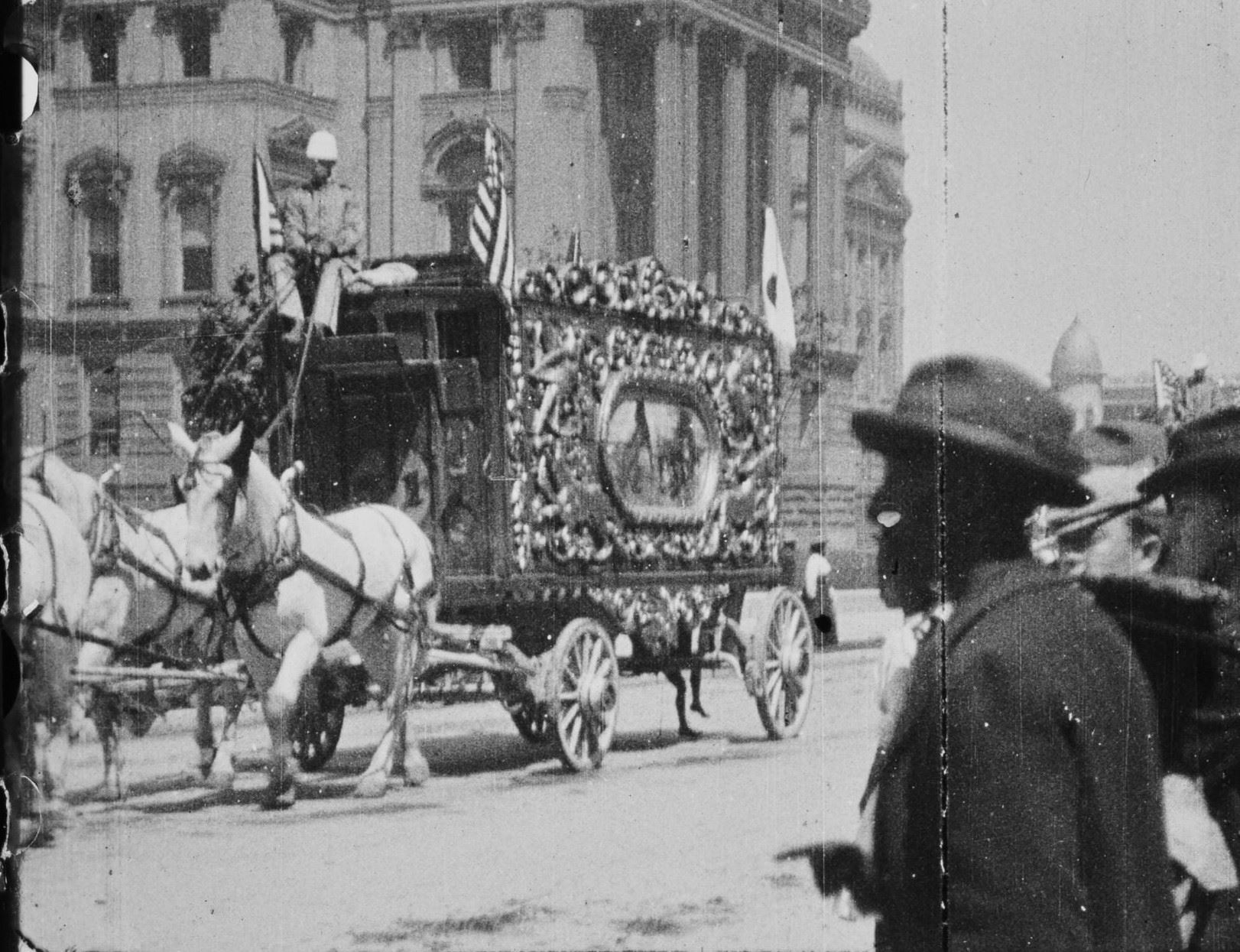
- still from the film
- Produced by: William Nicholas Selig
- Release date: July 1902
- Country: United States
- Language: Silent

Ringling Brothers Parade Film is a 1902 short subject film produced by William Nicholas Selig. The three-minute film captures a Ringling Brothers Circus parade featuring elephants, camels, and caged lions in downtown Indianapolis, Indiana. Onlookers are visible along the route as the parade moved south on Capitol Avenue, past the Indiana Statehouse, then east on Washington Street.

The film was thought lost until 2011 when an Oakland, California, couple donated an unmarked canister containing the film to the Niles Essanay Silent Film Museum. After the film was researched, identified, and restored, it was uploaded to YouTube in October 2020. In 2021, the film was deemed "culturally, historically, or aesthetically significant" by the Library of Congress and selected for preservation in the National Film Registry . It was chosen because it depicted a rare glimpse of a northern Black community in the early 20th century.

As of December 2021, it is the eleventh oldest film in the registry.

Ringling Brothers Parade Film (1902)
