= Renée Sylvaire =

French actress

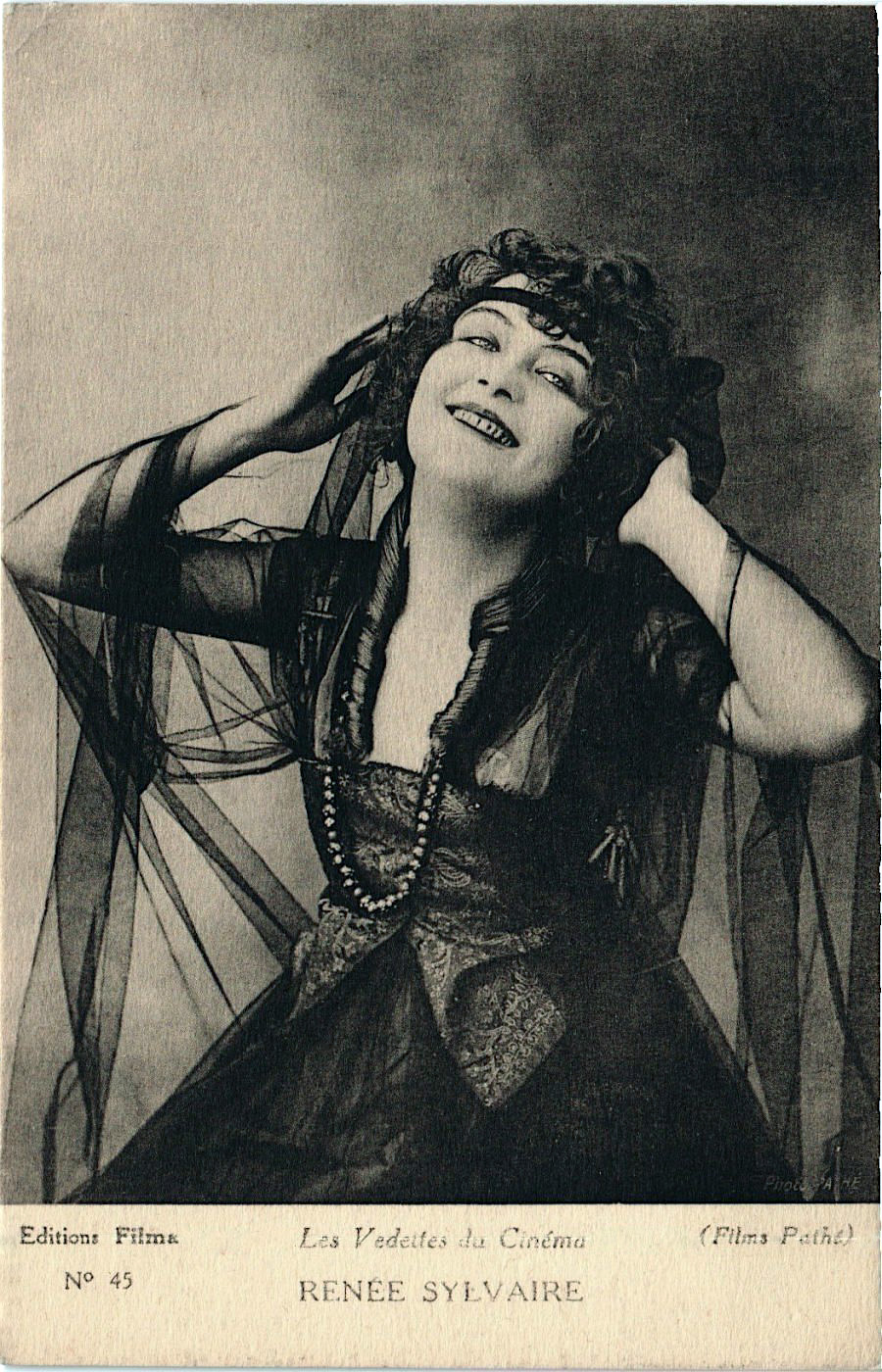
- Born: Renée Yvonne Marie Arcouet; March 16, 1892; Buenos Aires
- Died: July 17, 1971 (aged 79); 18th arrondissement of Paris
- Occupation: Actress
- Years active: 1908–1923 (film)

Renée Sylvaire is a French film actress of the silent era.

== Selected filmography ==
- The System of Doctor Goudron (1913)
- The Red Promenade (1914)
- The Secret of the Well (1914)
- The Sparrow (1914)
- Koenigsmark (1923)

== Bibliography ==
- Waldman, Harry. Maurice Tourneur: The Life and Films. McFarland, 2001.
