= 1910s in film =

List of years in film
- … 1900; 1901; 1902; 1903; 1904; 1905; 1906; 1907; 1908; 1909; 1910; 1911; 1912; 1913; 1914; 1915; 1916; 1917; 1918; 1919; 1920 …
- In television 1907 1908 1909 1910 1911 1912 1913
- Art; Archaeology; Architecture; Literature; Music; Philosophy; Science; +...

The decade of the 1910s in film involved some significant films.

== Events ==
The 1910s saw the origins of Hollywood as the centre of the American film industry relocated from New York to California. By 1912, major motion-picture companies had set up production near or in Los Angeles. In the early 1900s, most motion picture patents were held by Thomas Edison's Motion Picture Patents Company in New Jersey, and filmmakers were often sued to stop their productions. To escape this, filmmakers began moving out west, where Edison's patents could not be enforced. Also, the weather was ideal and there was quick access to various settings. Los Angeles became the capital of the film industry.

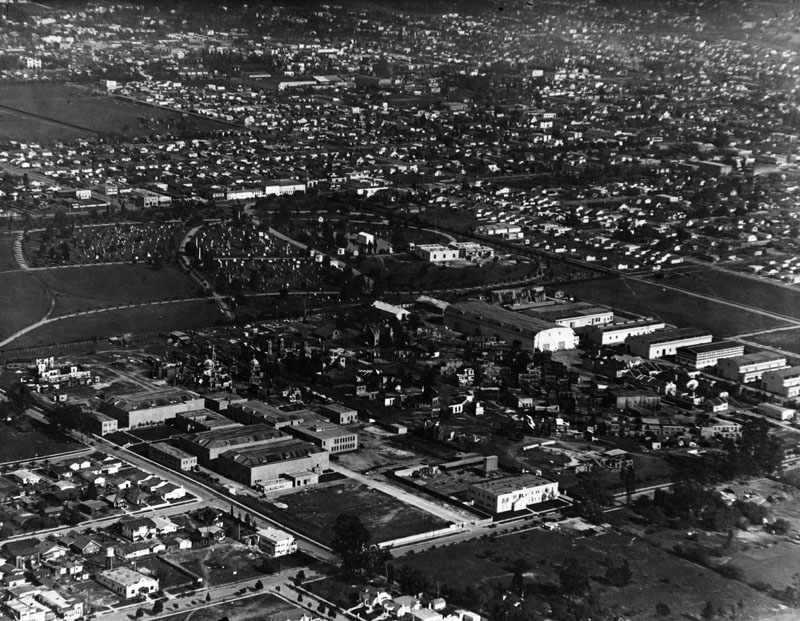
Hollywood movie studios, 1922

During the First World War the film industries of Europe were devastated, and Hollywood replaced the French and Italian firms as the most popular film makers in the world.

== Lists of films ==
- 1910 in film
- 1911 in film
- 1912 in film
- 1913 in film
- 1914 in film
- 1915 in film
- 1916 in film
- 1917 in film
- 1918 in film
- 1919 in film

== See also ==
- Film, History of film, Lists of films
