= 1874 in animation =

Events in 1874 in animation.

== Events ==
- December 9: In 1874, Jules Janssen made several practice discs for the recording of the passage of Venus with his series Passage de Vénus, which he intended to record with his photographic revolver. He used a model of the planet and a light source standing in for the Sun. While actual recordings of the passage of Venus have not been located, some practice discs survived and the images of one were turned into a short animated film after the development of cinematography. The images were purportedly taken in Japan by Janssen himself and the Brazilian engineer Francisco Antônio de Almeida by using Janssen's photographic revolver. The revolver could take several dozens of exposures at regulated intervals on a daguerreotype disc. The Janssen revolver was the instrument that originated chronophotography, a branch of photography based on capturing movement from a sequence of images. To create the apparatus Pierre Janssen was inspired by the revolving cylinder of Samuel Colt's revolver.
- Specific date unknown
  - One of the earliest examples of three-dimensional scientific visualisation was Maxwell's thermodynamic surface, sculpted in clay in 1874 by James Clerk Maxwell. This prefigured modern scientific visualization techniques that use computer graphics.
  - In 1874, the photographer Frederick Albert Bridge gave a series of lectures entitled Gems of English Scenery and Song, accompanied by magic lantern slides.
  - By 1874, the photographer Henry Taunt started performing magic lantern shows in his regular series of children's events.

== Births ==
=== January ===
- January 29: Raoul Barré, Canadian animator, cartoonist, and painter (co-founder of the animation studio Barré Studio which pioneered some early animation processes, including mechanical perforation of cels and animating special effects on glass; also worked as a contractor for the William Randolph Hearst-owned animation studio International Film Service, and as a "guest animator" for the film series Felix the Cat by Pat Sullivan Productions), (d. 1932).

=== April ===
- April 15: Arthur Melbourne-Cooper, British filmmaker and photographer, pioneer of stop-motion animation (Dolly's Toys, The Enchanted Toymaker), (d. 1961).

=== September ===
- September 21: Julienne Mathieu, French actress, screenwriter, and special effects artist, (acted in the silent film Hôtel électrique, one of the first films to incorporate stop motion animation; she was a specialist in the use of stop-motion animation, pixilation, overprinting, dissolving, and the tracking shot for special effects), (d. 1943).

== Deaths ==
=== Specific date unknown ===
- Henry Langdon Childe, English showman, (developer of the magic lantern image projector and dissolving views, a precursor of the dissolve in cinematic technique.
