= List of Spanish films before 1930 =

A list of the earliest films produced in the Cinema of Spain, ordered by year of release from 1897 to 1929. For an alphabetical list of articles on Spanish films, see Category:Spanish films.

== 1897-1929 ==
Title	Director	Cast	Genre	Notes
1897
Riña en un café	Fructuós Gelabert			
Salida de misa de doce del Pilar de Zaragoza	Eduardo Jimeno		Documentary, short	First Spanish film
1902
Choque de trenes	Segundo de Chomón		Documentary	First Chomón film.
1903
Los héroes del sitio de Zaragoza	Segundo de Chomón		Historical	
Gulliver en el país de los Gigantes	Segundo de Chomón		Fantasy	
1904
El heredero de Casa Pruna	Segundo de Chomón		Comedy	
1905
Los Guapos del parque	Segundo de Chomón		Comedy	
Los Sitios de Chile	Segundo de Chomón	Joaquín Carrasco	Historical	About the independence of Chile
1906
Boda de Alfonso XIII	Segundo de Chomón		Documentary	About the wedding of King Alfonso XIII
1907
Satán se divierte	Segundo de Chomón	Segundo de Chomón	Fantasy	
Sombras animadas	Segundo de Chomón		Fantasy	
1908
El Hotel eléctrico	Segundo de Chomón		Fantasy	
1912
La Casa de los duendes	Segundo de Chomón		Fantasy	
1916
La vida de Cristóbal Colón y su descubrimiento de América	Emile Bourgeois			
1921
La verbena de la paloma	José Buschs			Silent zarzuela
1922
Don Juan Tenorio (1922 film)	Ricardo de Baños			
1924
La revoltosa	Florián Rey			Silent zarzuela
1925
La casa de Troya	Alejandro Pérez Lugín			
Currito de la Cruz	Alejandro Pérez Lugín			
Gigantes y cabezudos	Florián Rey			Silent zarzuela
1926
Sahara Love	Sinclair Hill	Marie Colette, Jean Dehelly	Drama	Co-production with Britain
Valencian Rose	Mario Roncoroni	Carmen Viance	Drama	
1927
Lo más sublime	Josep Enric Ponsa	Antonio B. de Vila, Mercedes Doménech, Rosita Ponsa, Lina Vivarelli, Antonio Granell	Drama	unpublished images of the Costa Brava (Catalonia)
Malvaloca	Benito Perojo		Drama	
El negro que tenía el alma blanca	Benito Perojo			
Zalacaín el aventurero	Francisco Camacho			
Una aventura de cine	Juan de Orduña			
The Mendez Women	Fernando Delgado	Carmen Viance	Drama	
Al Hollywood madrileño	Nemesio M. Sobrevila			Experimental film
1928
Los chavales de la virgen	Florián Rey			
¡Viva Madrid, que es mi pueblo!	Fernando Delgado			
1929
Cuarenta y ocho pesetas de taxi	Fernando Delgado			
El gordo de navidad	Fernando Delgado			
El sexto sentido (film)	Nemesio M. Sobrevila			Experimental film
El misterio de la Puerta del Sol	Francisco Elías			First talking film in Spain
