= Slippery Jim =

1909 French silent trick film

Pickpock ne craint pas les entraves
- Directed by: Segundo de Chomón
- Release date: 1909
- Country: France

Slippery Jim (French: Pickpock ne craint pas les entraves) is an 8-minute 1909 French silent trick film directed by Segundo de Chomón and produced by Pathe-Freres. The film heavily utilizes stop-motion to aide in its visual comedy. It bears similarities to other films by Chomón, such as Diabolical Pickpocket (L'insaisissable pickpocket) produced in 1908 and The Invisible Thief (Le voleur invisible) also produced in 1909. The films share a thief capable of supernatural abilities while escaping the law.

This scene shows two police officers hiding behind a door to surprise the pickpocket. The pickpocket opens the door, leading it to flatten the two officers. This displays the stop-motion used heavily in the film to serve its comedic nature.

== Background ==
The film is known for its tricks and employs tactics such as reverse-motion and stop motion to make these tricks believable on the screen. In fact, Chomón is notorious for implementing such camera tricks in his other films. For example, he is able to make objects appear to move on their own in L’homme Invisible. A similar effect is also achieved in Chomón's Hôtel électrique.

== Plot ==
A mischievous pickpocket, Slippery Jim, is captured by the police and escorted to jail. The pickpocket, through a series of magical tricks, manages to evade the grasp of the law numerous times throughout the film. Jim hops out of a body of water, magically constructs a flying bicycle, disappears into thin air, and takes the form of a snake. The law can never catch up to Slippery Jim and his many tricks. In the end, the pickpocket gets the last laugh by turning the policemen into prisoners themselves.

== Visual effects ==
Chomón's use of visual effects serve to create comedic moments between the chase and search by the police officers of the film looking for the pickpocket. An effect often used by Chomón in the film is object animation, popularized by Georges Méliès years earlier.

A frequent visual effect used is reverse motion. This is used when the pickpocket escapes from the body of water by jumping from under the water up to the railing. Pickpocket defies the laws of nature for comedic purposes.

Chomón primarily uses special effects and narrative techniques within the film to enhance his story telling. Chomón utilized stop-motion and superimposition techniques, as well as creative editing, to create a film that stands out from the rest of the era's films.

== Production history ==
In 1904, Chomón moved from Barcelona to Paris, France to work for the film company, Pathe-Frères. This connection was due to his wife, Julienne Mathieu, and her involvement in Pathé films as an actress. He was hired for the company as an "operator" to create trick and animated films.^{[1]} Many of his films, while working for the Pathé company, specialized in visual effects. Chomón became known as the "Spanish Méliès" because of his style in France.

== Awards and nominations ==
Chomón heavily influenced early cinema. His films The Haunted House and The Electric Hotel cemented his reputation as one of the most innovative filmmakers of the silent era. In the modern day he has been acknowledged for his innovative work in the field of film, especially in the field of special effects.
