= Loie Fuller (film) =

1902 French short black-and-white silent film

- Release date: 1902
- Running time: 1 minute 22 seconds
- Country: France
- Language: Silent

Loie Fuller is a 1902 French short black-and-white silent film. The creator is listed as "anonymous" and is undated by the Jérôme Seydoux-Pathé Foundation. Some copies have been stencil-coloured with Pathécolor process in Julienne Mathieu and Segundo de Chomon's Barcelona workshop.

== Plot ==
After two special effects (a bat flying and landing and its transmutation into a dancer), the film depicts a serpentine dance, possibly performed by Loie Fuller.

== See also ==
- List of French films before 1910
