= Los héroes del sitio de Zaragoza =

- Directed by: Segundo de Chomón
- Produced by: Macaya y Marro
- Cinematography: Segundo de Chomón
- Production company: Hispano Film
- Release date: 1903
- Running time: 3 minutes 25 seconds
- Country: Spain
- Language: Silent

Los héroes del sitio de Zaragoza is a 1903 Spanish short black-and-white silent film directed by Segundo de Chomón.

The film stages three of the national heroes of the 1808 First Siege of Zaragoza during the Spanish War of Independence.

== Plot ==
The film is composed of three scenes introduced by intertitles:

Scene 1: Condesa de Bureta

A sitting room. A man and a woman loading guns. A group of men wearing guns enter and shoot from the windows. Some of them are hit by shots from outside.

Scene 2: El tío Jorge

A courtyard with an arched gate. A group of armed men behind a makeshift barricade are discussing. Some women bring them food. Soldiers come running in from behind the camera and start shooting at other soldiers coming from the other side of the gate. The invading soldiers reach the barricade but they are pushed back and routed by the defenders encouraged by a man standing on the barricade.

Scene 3: Agustina de Aragón

A cannon served by two men, in front of city walls. Several men are shot dead. A woman enters and seeing the dead men shoots herself the cannon, creating a huge cloud of smoke. When the smoke dissipates, a group of men celebrating victory appears while the woman waves a flag at the top of the city walls.

== Production ==
There are divergent views as to when this film was shot, the dates of 1901, 1903 or 1905 having been mentioned. Réjane Hamus-Vallée argues that there is no evidence supporting the fact that Chomón would have directed any film before 1903. She considers that this film is the oldest preserved film directed by Segundo de Chomón and that it likely was the first one produced by the producers Macaya & Marro

On the other hand, the style of the film, with single shot scenes and static frontal camera, seems to indicate that it was shot before Chomón's 1904 film El heredero de Casa Pruna which includes multishot scenes and camera panning.

== Historical significance ==
The film stages three celebrated heroes of the Spanish resistance against the Napoleonic invasion:

María de la Consolación Azlor, Condesa de Bureta, created and directed the Cuerpo de Amazonas [Amazon Corps], a special female corps that provided relief to the wounded and supplied food and ammunition to the fighters. In addition, she turned her palace into a hospital, and took up arms at times of danger.

Jorge Ibor y Casamayor (es), known as Tío Jorge (Uncle George) played a major role in the defence of Saragossa. The city gave his name to a park in 1958.

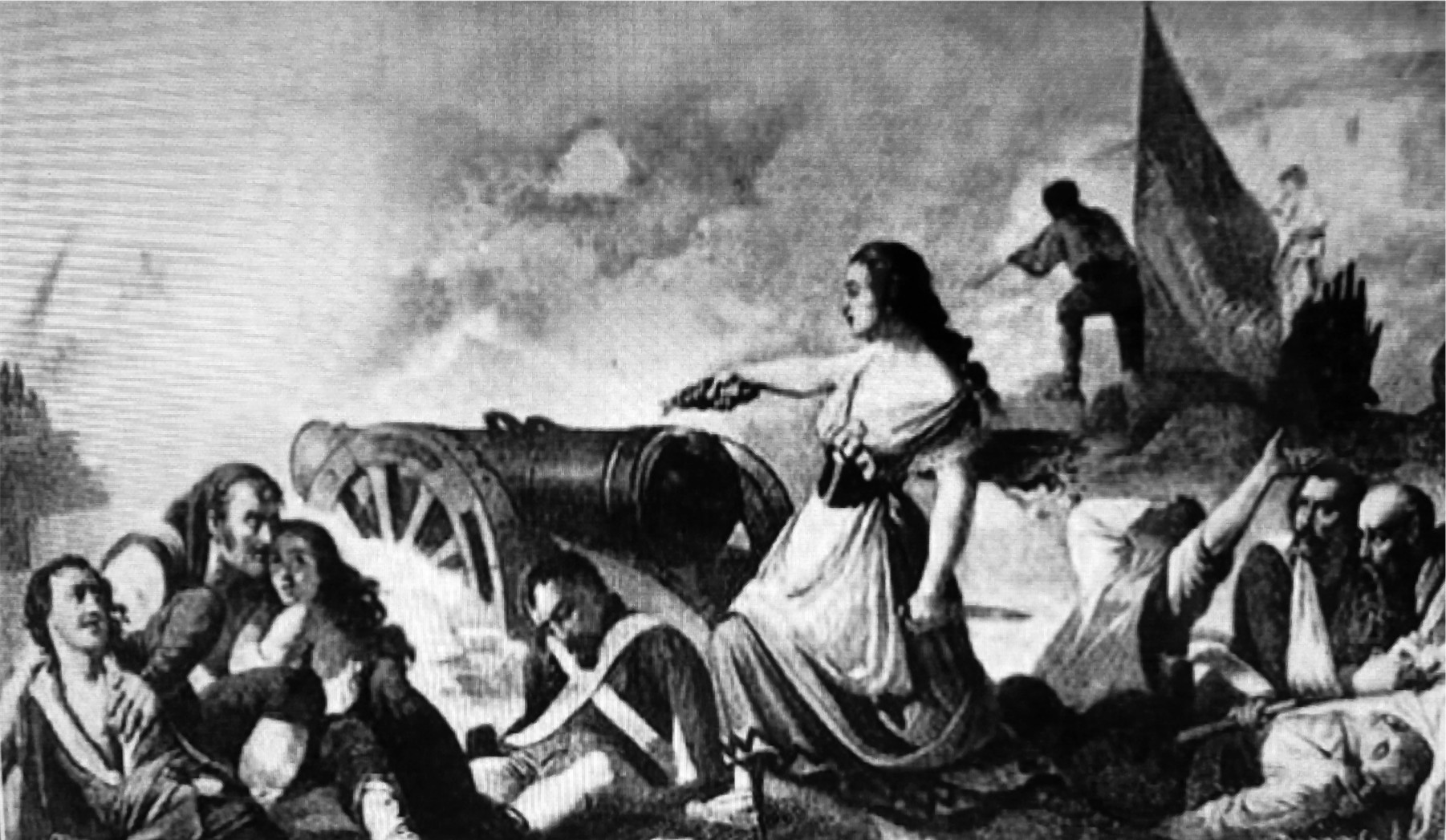
Painting by Miguel Navarro Cañizares
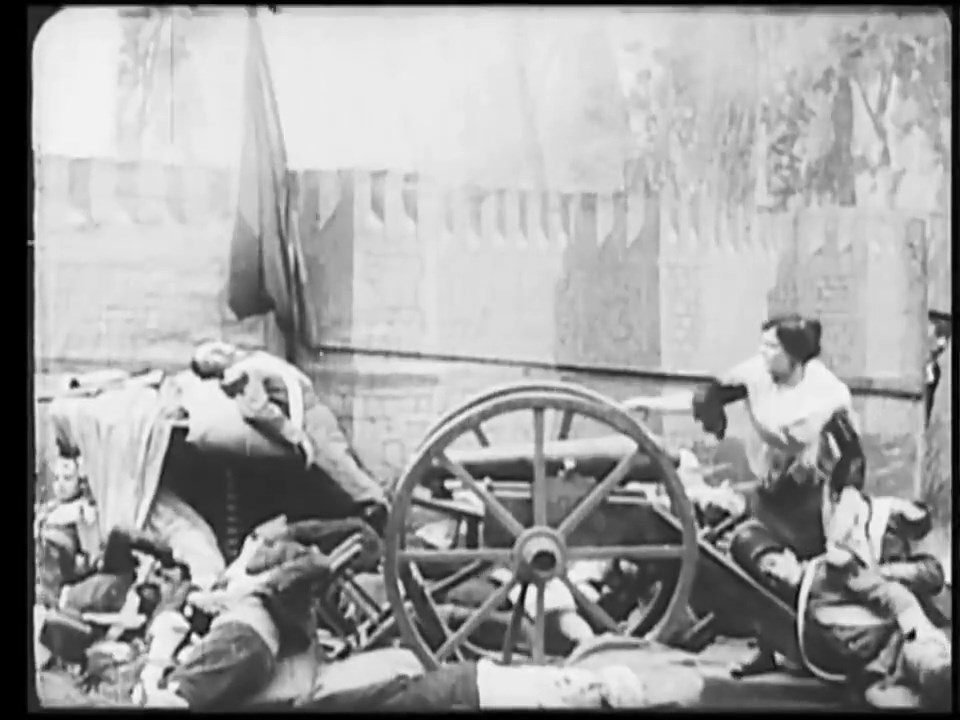
Screenshot

Agustina Raimunda María Saragossa Doménech, known as Agustina de Aragón, was an active defensor of the city who has become famous for one particular action: On June 15, 1808, the French army stormed the Portillo, an ancient gateway into the city defended by a hodgepodge battery of old cannons and a heavily outnumbered volunteer unit. Agustina, arriving on the ramparts with a basket of apples to feed the gunners, watched the nearby defenders fall to French bayonets.

The Spanish troops broke ranks, having suffered heavy casualties, and abandoned their posts. With the French troops a few yards away, Agustina herself ran forward, loaded a cannon, and lit the fuse, shredding a wave of attackers at point-blank range. This action has been the subject of a monumental statue erected in Saragossa and of several paintings, which have inspired the design of the set for the film.

== See also ==
- List of Spanish films before 1930
