= Le spectre rouge =

1907 French silent film

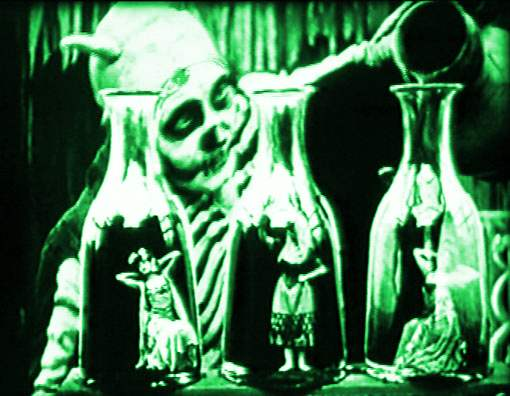
- Directed by: Segundo de Chomón
- Produced by: Pathé frères
- Starring: Segundo de Chomón, Julienne Mathieu
- Release date: 1907
- Running time: 9 minutes 57 seconds
- Country: France
- Language: Silent

Le spectre rouge (The red specter) is a 1907 French silent film directed by Segundo de Chomón. It is recognised as a major Spanish Gothic film and a major work of Chomón. Many sources mistakenly refer to it as Satan s'amuse, another short movie by the same director.

== Plot ==
Le spectre rouge (1907)

A demonic magician attempts to perform his act in a strange grotto, but is confronted by a Good Spirit who opposes him.
