= La fée printemps =

- Directed by: Ferdinand Zecca
- Produced by: Pathé Frères
- Release date: 1902
- Running time: 3 minutes
- Country: France
- Language: Silent

La fée printemps (English: The Spring Fairy) is a 1902 French short film directed by Ferdinand Zecca.

The film depicts a couple that offers a meal to an old woman. She then becomes a fairy that converts winter into spring.

The film has been stencil-colorized by Segundo de Chomón.

== See also ==
- List of French films before 1910
