= Éva Balla‑Falus =

Hungarian–French pioneer in puppet animation movies

- Balla Éva
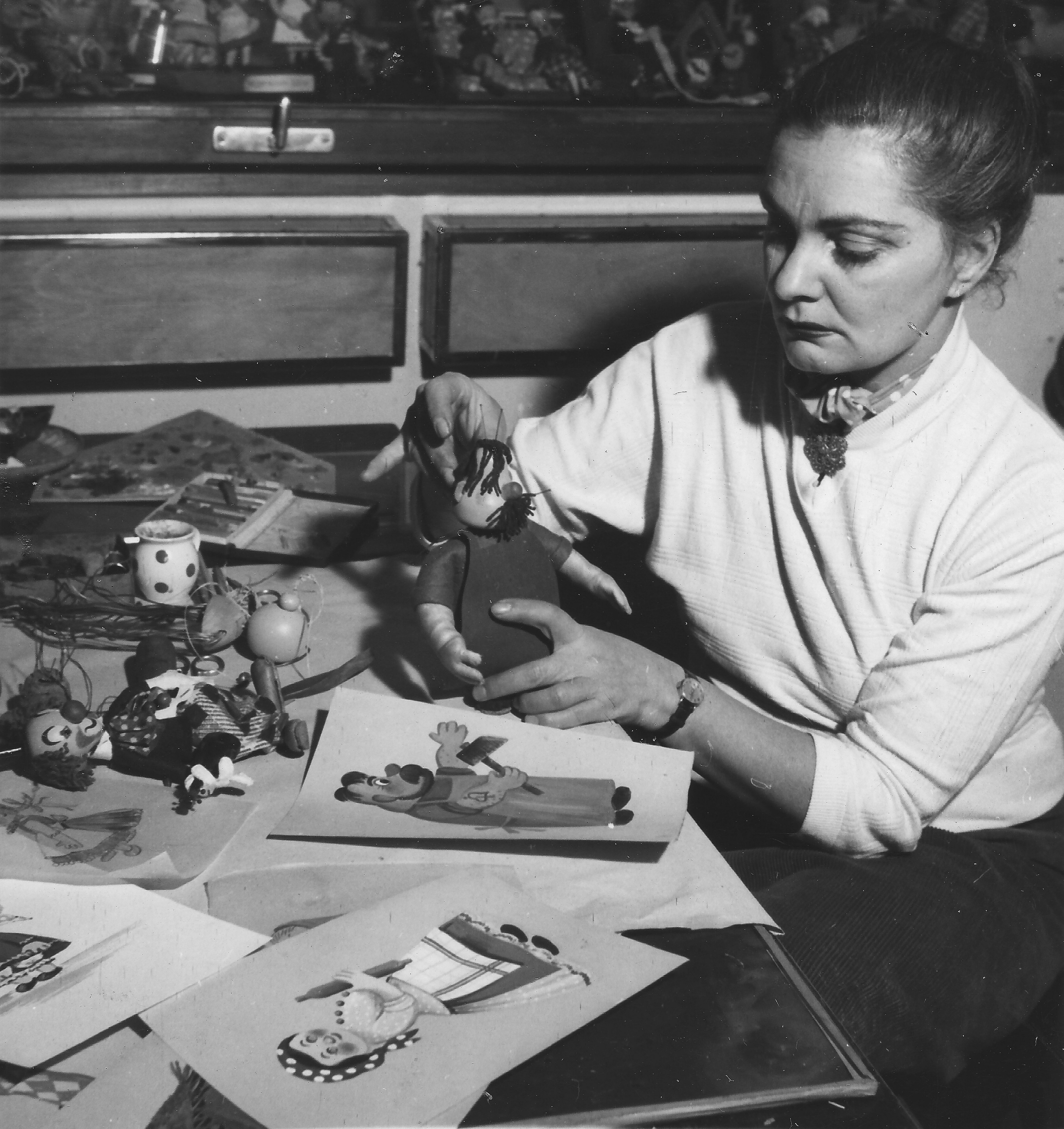
- Born: 18 February 1913; Diósförgepatony (now Orechová Potôň, Slovakia)
- Died: 27 March 1966 (aged 53); Paris, France
- Occupations: Graphic artist; painter; fashion designer; puppet designer; animated film director
- Years active: 1929–1966

Éva Balla‑Falus (née Éva Balla; Hungarian: Balla Éva; 18 February 1913 – 27 March 1966) was a Hungarian–French graphic artist, painter, fashion designer, puppet designer, and animated film director.

She was instrumental in the founding and development of Hungarian puppet animation between 1948 and 1956, with her work rediscovered in 2024 after decades in obscurity.

== Biography ==
=== Early life and education ===
Éva Balla was born on 18 February 1913 in Diósförgepatony (today Orechová Potôň, Slovakia), a small town near Dunaszerdahely, in what was then the Austro-Hungarian monarchy. His father, Imre Balla, worked as a manager in a neighbouring estate. At the age of 10, her family moved to Szeged, where his parents are from. They did not wish to become Slovak citizens after the Treaty of Trianon which detached Slovakia from Hungary.

In Szeged, Éva Balla grew up in a large family with many uncles, aunts and cousins. Her father ran a family timber business, his uncles were lawyers and his older brother was an engineer. Éva Balla-Falus attends the Árpád-házi Szent Erzsébet high school (now Tömörkény-István high school). From an early age, she showed great interest in drawing and painting.

In 1929, at the age of 16, Éva Balla moved to Budapest to live with her paternal grandparents and enrolled in the Graphic School of the Circle of Friends of the Arts of the Hungarian National Association for Jewish Education (OMIKE). This school was created for young artists of Jewish faith who were excluded from higher education in visual arts because of the "numerus clausus" established in 1920. At OMIKE, she studied under the direction of Béla Kreisel and befriended Anna Margit, a classmate with whom she shared her passion for art and who became a well-known painter.

Éva Balla joined the artistic circles of Budapest, frequenting artists such as Alexandre Trauner, György Kepes, Dezső Korniss and Béla Veszelszky. She also participates in passionate debates on the avant-garde artistic trends of the time. In 1931, two of his posters were published in the magazine Magyar Grafika. She participated in an exhibition of advertising graphics and drawings organized by OMIKE graduates. His poster projects made up the bulk of the exhibition and were cited in the press for their talent.

=== Paris, 1932–1945 ===
In 1932, she moved to Paris in the hope of finding better artistic opportunities than those offered by Budapest, where conditions were difficult for young people of Jewish faith. Despite difficult living conditions, she continued to draw and paint, attending the workshops of the Académie de la Grande Chaumière and the cubist painter André Lhote.

She joined a circle of Hungarian artists, including the sculptor István Hajdú and the photographers Ervin Marton and André de Dienes, and worked as a model for fashion photographs and advertisements, collaborating with the fashion magazine La Gamme.

During World War II, she lost her husband, François Cecconi, killed in action in 1940. She took part of the French Resistance, participating in reconnaissance missions for the FTP‑MOI and making forged documents. At the end of the conflict, in 1945, she organized an exhibition in Limoges, which became itinerant, documenting the liberation of France.

=== Return to Hungary and animation career ===
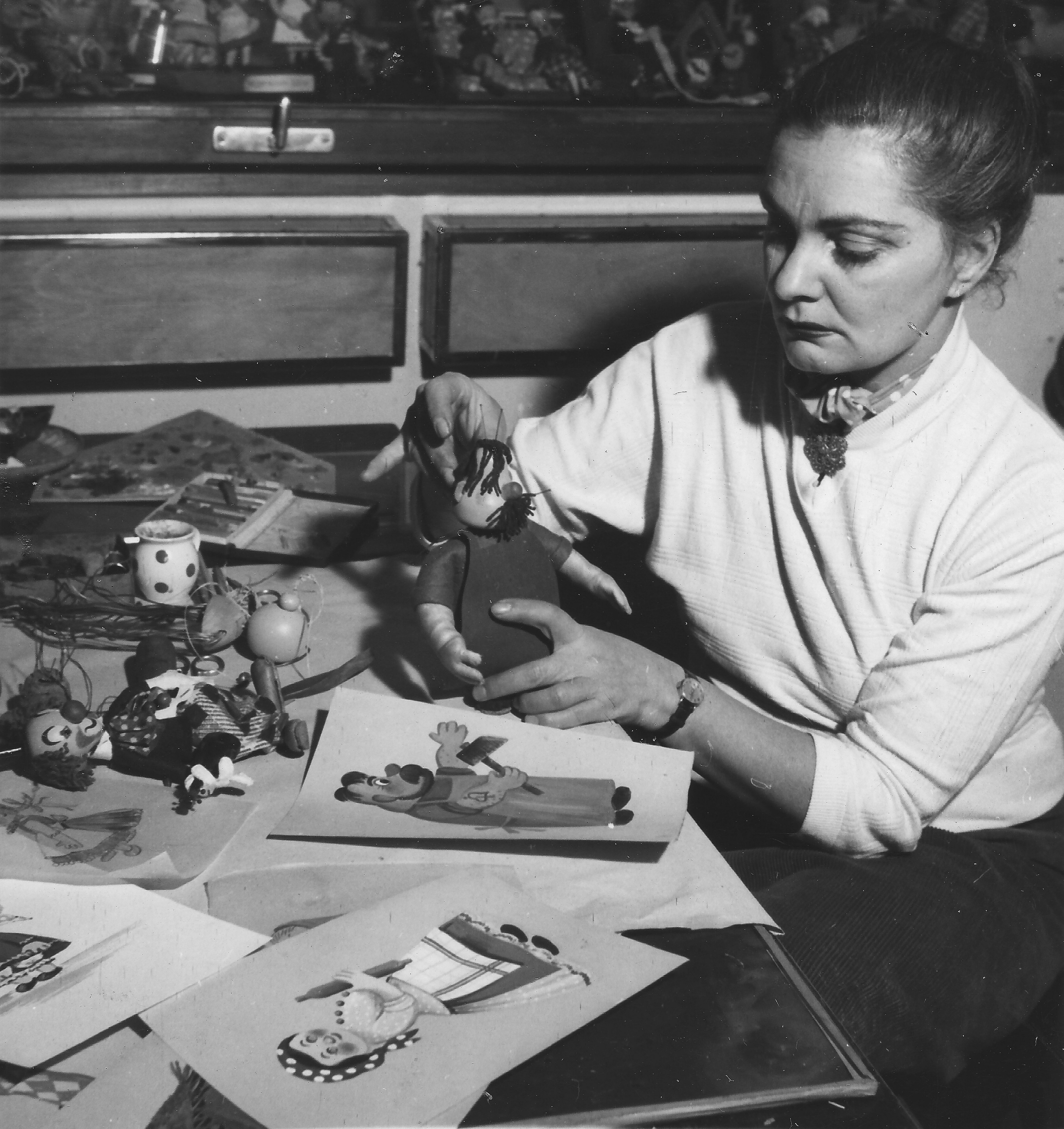
Filmmaker Éva Balla-Falus at the puppet studio (1955)

In 1946, Éva Balla returned to Hungary. She married Andor Falus in 1947, a doctor she met in Paris and who was also part of the Resistance; they had two children, Juli and Jean.

She worked as an illustrator for various newspapers and designs fashion catalogues like Gladys. In 1948, she began working on animated films with the sculptor Zoltán Olcsai-Kiss, inspired by the Soviet animated film The New Gulliver (1935) as well as the theatre of Géza Blattner.

Their first project, Megy a juhász szamáron (The shepherd on his donkey), based on a poem by Sándor Petőfi, is not broadcast due to ideological criticism. Their second film, Vitamin ABC (1950), was an immediate success and was shown in cinemas for many years. In 1951, she released Kacsa (The Rumor), based on a script by Fedor Ágnes. In 1953, she released Balkéz Tóbiás (Clumsy Tobias). In 1956, the film Mese a mihaszna köcsögről (Tale of the Useless Pot), according to Mészöly Miklós, was a success overshadowed by the political events which it seems to announce. His last film was released in 1957, A didergő király (The Fearful King), based on a tale by Móra Ferenc, but his name is absent from the credits to sanction his dissent.

Éva Balla-Falus continued to work on animated films, creating memorable and innovative characters. She also directed numerous puppet commercials, which were broadcast not only in the countries of the Eastern bloc but also in Scandinavia, Switzerland, the Middle East and the Far East.

=== Return to Paris and later life ===
In 1957, disappointed by political restrictions in Hungary, Éva Balla-Falus moved back to Paris with her family. She continued working artistically, drawing and painting, creating puppets and figurines that she sell. She was also trying to get involved in the animation industry, but her declining health and challenges of everyday life prevented her from doing so.

Éva Balla-Falus died on 27 March 1966 in Paris, leaving behind a rich and varied heritage that was rediscovered and appreciated decades later. The legacy of Éva Balla-Falus, including drawings, puppets and documents, is highlighted by her daughter, Juli Faloux, and by the Hungarian Film Institute (NFI), the Filmarchívum, in 2024.

== Selected filmography ==
- 1948 – Megy a juhász szamáron (unreleased; based on Petőfi)
- 1950 – Vitamin ABC
- 1951 – Kacsa
- 1953 – Balkéz Tóbiás
- 1956 – Mese a mihaszna köcsögről
- 1957 – A didergő király
