= Montserrat (film) =

- Directed by: Segundo de Chomón
- Release date: 1902
- Country: Spain
- Language: Silent

Montserrat is a 1902 Spanish short black-and-white silent documentary film directed by Segundo de Chomón.

== See also ==
- List of Spanish films before 1930
