= 1907 in film =

The year 1907 in film involved some significant events.

== Events ==
- January 19 – Variety publishes its first film review.
- The Kalem Company founded in New York City by Frank J. Marion, Samuel Long, and George Kleine.
- May 7 – Seattle film maker William Harbeck sets up a camera at the front of a B.C. Electric streetcar and films the downtown streets of Vancouver, British Columbia. Pieces of the film, the earliest surviving footage of the city, have disappeared, only about 7 minutes remain.
- May 29 – Salaviinanpolttajat, also known as The Moonshiners, the first fictional film made in Finland, is released.
- June 20 – L'Enfant prodigue, the first feature-length motion picture produced in Europe, opens in Paris.
- Peerless Film Manufacturing Company was founded in Chicago by George K. Spoor and Gilbert M. Anderson. On August 10, the studio name was changed to Essanay Studios ("S and A").
- November 28 - In Haverhill, Massachusetts, scrap-metal dealer Louis B. Mayer opens his first movie theatre (in a few years he had the largest theatre chain in New England and in 1917 he founded his own production company, which eventually became part of Metro-Goldwyn-Mayer).
- December 7 – First Ben-Hur film, directed by Sidney Olcott and produced by the Kalem Company, released.
- Carl Laemmle, later of Universal, experiments with combining audio from phonographs with film. Laemmle's experiments lead to the German development of "Syncroscope." Syncroscope had several successful demonstrations, but was eventually abandoned.

== Notable films ==
=== B ===
- Ben Hur, directed by Sidney Olcott, based on the 1880 novel Ben-Hur: A Tale of the Christ by Lew Wallace – (US)
- The Bewildering Cabinet (Le Placard infernal) (lost), directed by Georges Méliès – (France)

=== C ===
- The Clock-Maker's Secret (Le Secret de l'horloger), directed by Gaston Velle – (France)
- Le Cochon Danseur (The Dancing Pig), directed by Millard Mercury – (France)
- A Curious Dream, directed by J. Stuart Blackton – (US)

=== D ===
- The Doll's Revenge, directed by Cecil Hepworth – (UK)

=== E ===
- The Eclipse, or the Courtship of the Sun and Moon (L'éclipse du soleil en pleine lune), directed by Georges Méliès – (France)
- L'Enfant prodigue (The Prodigal Son), directed by Michel Carré, starring Georges Wague – (France)

=== F ===
- First Prize for the Cello (Premier Prix de violoncelle) – (France)

=== G ===
- The Golden Beetle (Le Scarabée d'or), directed by Segundo de Chomón – (France)
- Good Glue Sticks (La Colle universelle), directed by Georges Méliès – (France)

=== H ===
- The Haunted Hotel, directed by J. Stuart Blackton – (US)

=== I ===
- In the Bogie Man's Cave (La Cuisine de l'ogre), directed by Georges Méliès – (France)

=== L ===
- Laughing Gas, directed by Edwin S. Porter – (US)
- Løvejagten (The Lion Hunt), directed by Viggo Larsen – (Denmark)

=== M ===
- La Marseillaise, directed by Georges Mendel – (France)

=== P ===
- The Policemen's Little Run (La Course des sergents de ville), directed by Ferdinand Zecca – (France)

=== R ===
- The Race for the Sausage (Course à la saucisse), directed by Alice Guy – (France)
- The Red Spectre (Le spectre rouge), directed by Segundo de Chomón and Ferdinand Zecca – (France)
- Robert Macaire and Bertrand (Robert Macaire et Bertrand, les rois de cambrioleurs), directed by Georges Méliès – (France)

=== S ===
- Salaviinanpolttajat (The Moonshiners) (lost), directed by Louis Sparre and Teuvo Puro – (Finland)
- Satan s'amuse (Satan at Play), directed by Segundo de Chomón – (France)

=== T ===
- That Fatal Sneeze, directed by Lewin Fitzhamon – (UK)
- Tunneling the English Channel (Le Tunnel sous la Manche ou le Cauchemar franco-anglais), directed by Georges Méliès – (France)

=== U ===
- Under the Seas (Deux Cents Milles sous les mers ou le Cauchemar du pêcheur) (incomplete), directed by Georges Méliès, based on the 1870 novel Twenty Thousand Leagues Under the Seas by Jules Verne – (France)

=== V ===
- Vancouver, directed by William Harbeck – (Canada)

=== W ===
- When the Devil Drives, directed by Walter R. Booth – (UK)

== Births ==
Month	Date	Name	Country	Profession	Died
January	3	Ray Milland	UK	Actor, Director	1986
January	6	Helen Kleeb	US	Actress	2003
January	16	Alexander Knox	Canada	Actor	1995
January	20	Paula Wessely	Austria	Actress, Producer	2000
January	22	Mary Dresselhuys	Netherlands	Actress	2004
February	12	Joseph Kearns	US	Actor	1962
February	15	Cesar Romero	US	Actor	1994
February	22	Sheldon Leonard	US	Actor, Director, Producer, Writer	1997
February	22	Robert Young	US	Actor	1998
March	4	Edgar Barrier	US	Actor	1964
March	19	Kent Smith	US	Actor	1985
March	27	Mary Treen	US	Actress	1989
March	31	Eddie Quillan	US	Actor, Singer	1990
April	11	Paul Douglas	US	Actor	1959
April	19	Lina Basquette	US	Actress	1994
April	29	Fred Zinnemann	Austria	Director	1997
May	12	Katharine Hepburn	US	Actress	2003
May	22	Laurence Olivier	UK	Actor, Director	1989
May	26	John Wayne	US	Actor	1979
June	4	Rosalind Russell	US	Actress, Comedienne, Screenwriter, Singer	1976
June	16	Jack Albertson	US	Actor, Comedian, Dancer, Singer	1981
June	27	John McIntire	US	Actor	1991
June	29	Joan Davis	US	Actress	1961
July	14	Annabella	France	Actress	1996
July	14	Olive Borden	US	Actress	1947
July	15	Craig Reynolds	US	Actor	1949
July	15	Mona Rico	Mexico	Actress	1994
July	16	Barbara Stanwyck	US	Actress, Model, Dancer	1990
July	19	Isabel Jewell	US	Actress	1972
July	22	Phillips Holmes	US	Actor	1942
July	27	Ross Alexander	US	Actor	1937
August	3	Adrienne Ames	US	Actress	1947
August	3	Irene Tedrow	US	Actress	1995
August	12	Joe Besser	US	Actor, Comedian, Musician	1988
August	31	Argentina Brunetti	Argentina	Actress	2005
September	4	Reggie Nalder	Austria	Actor	1991
September	10	Tala Birell	Romania	Actress	1958
September	15	Fay Wray	Canada	Actress	2004
September	18	Leon Askin	Austria	Actor	2005
September	29	Gene Autry	US	Singer, Songwriter, Actor	1998
October	17	John Marley	US	Actor	1986
November	10	Salme Reek	Estonia	Actress	1996
November	16	Burgess Meredith	US	Actor, Filmmaker	1997
November	18	Gustav Nezval	Czechoslovakia	Actor	1998
December	16	Barbara Kent	Canada	Actress	2011
December	22	Peggy Ashcroft	UK	Actress	1991
December	25	Mike Mazurki	Austria-Hungary	Actor, Wrestler	1990
December	25	Cab Calloway	US	Actor	1994

== Deaths ==
- August 30 – Richard Mansfield, stage actor who influenced many later film actors (born 1857)

== Debuts ==
- Linda Arvidson – Mr. Gay and Mrs. (short)
- Robert Harron – Dr. Skinium (short)
- William S. Hart – Ben Hur (short)
- Florence Turner – How to Cure a Cold (short)
