= List of American films of 1907 =

Laughing Gas

Around 400 American films were released in 1907 from the Biograph, Edison Studios, Essanay Studios, Kalem, Lubin, Miles Brothers, Selig, and Vitagraph Studios companies. A majority of the films exhibited in the U.S. in 1907 were from Europe.

Title	Director	Cast	Genre	Notes
Amateur Night; or, Get the Hook				
Ben Hur	Sidney Olcott	William S. Hart	Historical	
Daniel Boone	Wallace McCutcheon and Edwin S. Porter	William Craven, Florence Lawrence	Biographical	
How Brown Saw the Baseball Game	Unknown	Unknown	Comedy	
Laughing Gas	Edwin Stanton Porter	Bertha Regustus, Edward Boulden	Comedy	
Terrible Ted	Joseph A. Golden		Short comedy	
The Tired Tailor's Dream	Joseph A. Golden		Short comedy	

== See also ==
- AFI Catalog of Feature Films
- 1907 in the United States
