= Dolly's Toys =

1901 film by Arthur Melbourne-Cooper

- Directed by: Arthur Melbourne-Cooper
- Release date: 1901
- Running time: 80 seconds
- Country: United Kingdom
- Language: Silent

Dolly's Toys was a 1901 British trick film, directed by Arthur Melbourne-Cooper. It may have used stop-motion animation, or a variant of the stop-action technique previously used by Walter R. Booth. Cooper would start producing animated films in 1904, starting with The Enchanted Toymaker. It is considered a lost film.

Melbourne-Cooper directed the 1908 film His Dreams of Toyland, where toys were brought to life through use of stop-motion animation. Dolly's Toys featured a similar plot. This has fueled speculation that it was an early animated film by Melbourne-Cooper. But it may have instead used techniques pioneered by Walter R. Booth in Dreamland Adventures (1907), the techniques of stop-action and double exposure.

== Plot ==
A young girl falls asleep. She sleeps with her doll. She dreams that her doll comes to life.

== Production ==
In 1901, Melbourne-Cooper's father died and his photographic studio at Osborne Terrace shut down. At this point, Melbourne-Cooper formed his own companies, the Alpha Trading Company and the Alpha Cinematograph Works. He set up premises at Bedford Park, St. Albans. His film studio included its own film laboratory, workshops, and dressing rooms for its acting cast.

The role of the dreaming girl in 'Dolly's Toys was probably played by the child actress Nellie Dewhurst, who lived in St. Albans. She gave an interview about this role in her later life.

The film was a simple short film with two shots, 80 ft (24 m) in length, and a running time of 1 minute and 20 seconds. The first scene was in live-action, while the scene with the living doll was probably animated shot by shot. In an interview with Audrey Wadowska (Melbourne-Cooper's daughter), she reported that only one doll was used in the film. She was certain that the film used animation.

The film was listed in Robert W. Paul's catalogue of Animatograph pictures.

== Sources ==
- Crafton, Donald (2015), "The Trickfilm Tradition", Before Mickey:The Animated Film 1898-1928, University of Chicago Press, ISBN 978-0226231020
- de Vries, Tjitte; Mul, Ati (2009), "Stubborn and Ineradicable", "They Thought it was a Marvel": Arthur Melbourne-Cooper (1874-1961) : Pioneer of Puppet Animation, Amsterdam University Press, ISBN 978-9085550167
- Stewart, Jez (2021), "Signing In and Signing Up", The Story of British Animation, Bloomsbury Publishing, ISBN 9781911239727
