= Salida de la misa de doce de la Iglesia del Pilar de Zaragoza =

1897 film by Eduardo Jimeno

Salida de la misa de doce de la Iglesia del Pilar de Zaragoza is an 1897 short silent film by Eduardo Jimeno, a pioneer of the Spanish cinema.

This short film is probably the first one filmed in Spain by a Spaniard.

== Trivia ==
This film's title in Spanish translates to "Exit of the Mass of the Twelve of the Church of the Pillar of Zaragoza"

== See also ==
- Cinema of Spain
- List of Spanish films before 1930
