= Gulliver en el país de los Gigantes =

Gulliver en el país de los gigantes
- Directed by: Segundo de Chomón
- Release date: 1903
- Country: Spain
- Language: Silent

Gulliver en el país de los gigantes (Spanish: "Gulliver in the Land of the Giants") is a 1903 (Note: There are some doubts about the production year, it could be 1904.) Spanish short black-and-white silent film directed by Segundo de Chomón.

The film is based on the Jonathan Swift's 1726 novel Gulliver's Travels (its second part).

== See also ==
- List of Spanish films before 1930
