= Ah! La Barbe =

1905 film by Segundo de Chomón

- Video of the Short.
- Directed by: Segundo de Chomón
- Distributed by: Pathé Frères
- Release date: 1905
- Running time: 2 minutes
- Country: France
- Language: Silent film

Ah! La Barbe (English: Ah! Beard, known in the United States as A Funny Shave) is a 1905 French trick film directed by Segundo de Chomón. The film shows a man who, whilst shaving, eats a portion of his shaving cream. This causes him to see hallucinations of grotesque faces in his mirror, which brings him to shatter the glass.
