= Descente du Mont Serrat =

- Directed by: Segundo de Chomón
- Release date: 1901
- Country: France
- Language: Silent

Descente du Mont Serrat is a 1901 French short black-and-white silent documentary film directed by Segundo de Chomón.

== See also ==
- List of French films before 1910
