= Barcelone, Parc au crépuscule =

- Directed by: Segundo de Chomón
- Produced by: Pathé
- Release date: 1904
- Running time: 2 minutes
- Country: France
- Language: Silent

Barcelone, Parc au crépuscule is a 1904 French short black-and-white silent documentary film directed by Segundo de Chomón. The film depicts the parks of Barcelona, Spain.

== See also ==
- List of French films before 1910
