= Choque de trenes =

- Directed by: Segundo de Chomón
- Release date: 1902
- Running time: 3 minutes
- Country: Spain
- Language: Silent

Choque de trenes is a 1902 Spanish short black-and-white silent documentary film directed by Segundo de Chomón.

== Trivia ==
The film's title is Spanish for "Train Crash."

== See also ==
- List of Spanish films before 1930
