= Danse des Ouléd-Naïd =

- Directed by: Segundo de Chomón
- Release date: 1902
- Running time: 2 minutes
- Country: France
- Language: Silent

Danse des Ouléd-Naïd is a 1902 French short silent film directed by Segundo de Chomón.

The film depicts a female Algerian dancer.

== See also ==
- List of French films before 1910
