= María de la Consolación Azlor =

Countess of Bureta (1775–1814)

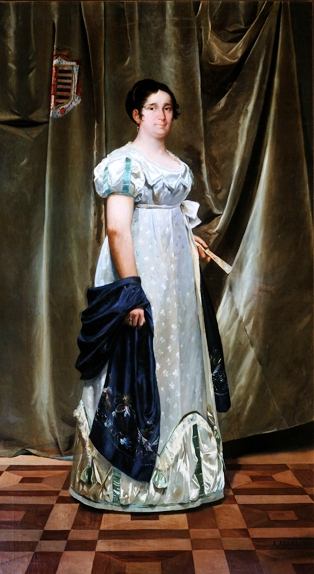
- María de la Consolación Azlor
- Born: 12 May 1775; Girona, Spain
- Died: 23 December 1814 (aged 39); Zaragoza
- Occupation: writer

María de la Consolación Azlor (12 May 1775 – 23 December 1814) also known as The Countess of Bureta, was a Spanish noblewoman, heroine of the Sieges of Zaragoza. She married Juan Crisóstomo López-Fernández de Heredia y Marín de Resende Francia.
