= Le Cochon Danseur =

1907 silent French burlesque film by French company Pathé

Le Cochon danseur

Le Cochon Danseur (English: The Dancing Pig) is a silent, 4 minute long, black-and-white burlesque film released in 1907 by the French company Pathé, apparently based on a Vaudeville act.

== Plot ==
In the film, a giant anthropomorphic pig dressed in fancy clothes attempts to woo a young maiden, only to be rebuffed. When the pig becomes increasingly aggressive in his efforts to seduce her, she retaliates by tearing his clothes off, leaving him embarrassed. Thereafter, the two start to dance together, then walk into the curtains behind them. In the infamous final scene, the pig moves his tongue and eyes around and then bares his teeth, possibly in an attempt to show the puppet's mechanical abilities.

== Home media ==
The film was released on DVD as part of Flicker Alley's Saved from the Flames set in 2008.

== Legacy ==
The film had fallen into obscurity for over a century (film preservationist David Shepard struck a print of this film in the 1980s to the point of circulating it in film festivals), but gained more notoriety around 2007, a century after its filming. It became an Internet meme, with Clarisse Loughrey stating that the film "will definitely be entering into your nightmares tonight".
