= Stop motion =

Animation technique

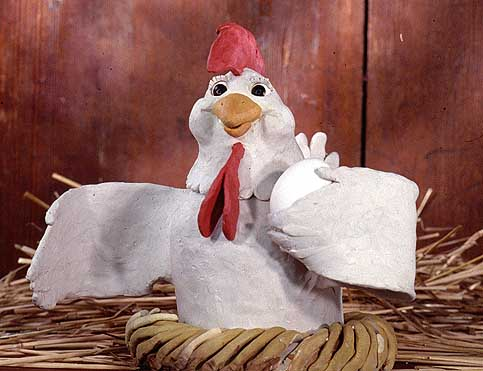
A clay model of a chicken, designed to be used in a clay stop motion animation

Stop motion (also known as stop frame animation or object animation) is an animated filmmaking and special effects technique in which objects are physically manipulated in small increments between individually photographed frames so that they will appear to exhibit independent motion or change when the series of frames is played back. Any kind of object can thus be animated, but puppets with movable joints (puppet animation) or clay figures (claymation) are most commonly used. Puppets, models or clay figures built around an armature are used in model animation. Stop motion with live actors is often referred to as pixilation. Stop motion of flat materials such as paper, fabrics or photographs is usually called cutout animation.

A stop motion video

A penny which appears to be moving on its own through stop motion techniques

== Terminology ==
The term "stop motion", relating to the animation technique, is often spelled with a hyphen as "stop-motion"—either standalone or as a compound modifier. Both orthographic variants, with and without the hyphen, are correct, but the hyphenated one has a second meaning that is unrelated to animation or cinema: "a device for automatically stopping a machine or engine when something has gone wrong".

== History ==
The use of animated objects in film has been present since the early days of cinema.

=== 1849 to 1895: Before film ===
Before the advent of chronophotography in 1878, a small number of photograph series depicted subjects in successive positions. These can now be regarded as a form of stop motion or pixilation, although very few results were meant to be animated. Until celluloid film base was established in 1888 and set the standard for the moving image, animation could only be presented via mechanisms such as the zoetrope.

In 1849, Joseph Plateau published a note about improvements for his Fantascope (a.k.a. phénakisticope). A new translucent variation had improved picture quality and could be viewed with both eyes, by several people at the same time. Plateau stated that the illusion could be advanced even further with an idea communicated to him by Charles Wheatstone: a combination of the fantascope and Wheatstone's stereoscope. Plateau thought the construction of a sequential set of stereoscopic image pairs would be the more difficult part of the plan than adapting two copies of his improved fantascope to be fitted with a stereoscope. Wheatstone had suggested using photographs on paper of a solid object, for instance a statuette. Plateau concluded that for this purpose 16 plaster models could be made with 16 regular modifications. He believed such a project would take much time and careful effort, but would be quite worth it because of the expected marvelous results. The plan was never executed, possibly because Plateau was almost completely blind by this time.

In 1852, Jules Duboscq patented a "Stéréoscope-fantascope ou Bïoscope" (or abbreviated as stéréofantascope) stroboscopic disc. The only known extant disc contains stereoscopic photograph pairs of different phases of the motion of a machine. Due to the long exposure times necessary to capture an image with the photographic emulsions of the period, the sequence could not be recorded live and must have been assembled from separate photographs of the various positions of the machinery.

In 1855, Johann Nepomuk Czermak published an article about his Stereophoroskop and other experiments aimed at stereoscopic moving images. He mentioned a method of sticking needles in a stroboscopic disc so that it looked like one needle was being pushed in and out of the cardboard when animated. He realized that this method provided basically endless possibilities to make different 3D animations. He then introduced two methods to animate stereoscopic pairs of images, one was basically a stereo viewer using two stroboscopic discs and the other was more or less similar to the later zoetrope. Czermak explained how suitable stereoscopic photographs could be made by recording a series of models, for instance to animate a growing pyramid.

On 27 February 1860, Peter Hubert Desvignes received British patent no. 537 for 28 monocular and stereoscopic variations of cylindrical stroboscopic devices (much like the later zoetrope). Desvignes' Mimoscope, received an Honourable Mention "for ingenuity of construction" at the 1862 International Exhibition in London. Desvignes "employed models, insects and other objects, instead of pictures, with perfect success".

In 1874, Jules Janssen made several practice discs for the recording of the passage of Venus with his series Passage de Vénus with his photographic revolver. He used a model of the planet and a light source standing in for the sun. While actual recordings of the passage of Venus have not been located, some practice discs survived and the images of one were turned into a short animated film decades after the development of cinematography.

In 1887, Étienne-Jules Marey created a large zoetrope with a series of plaster models based on his chronophotographs of birds in flight.

=== 1895–1928: The silent film era ===
It is estimated that 80 to 90 percent of all silent films are lost. Extant contemporary movie catalogs, reviews and other documentation can provide some details on lost films, but this kind of written documentation is also incomplete and often insufficient to properly date all extant films or even identify them if original titles are missing. Whether any scene was created with stop-motion techniques often remains unclear in extant descriptions. The principles of animation and other special effects were mostly kept a secret, not only to prevent use of such techniques by competitors, but also to keep audiences interested in the mystery of the magic tricks.

Stop motion is closely related to the stop trick, in which the camera is temporarily stopped during the recording of a scene to create a change before filming is continued (or for which the cause of the change is edited out of the film). In the resulting film, the change will be sudden and a logical cause of the change will be mysteriously absent or replaced with a fake cause that is suggested in the scene. The oldest known example is used for the beheading in Edison Manufacturing Company's 1895 film The Execution of Mary Stuart. The technique of stop motion can be interpreted as repeatedly applying the stop trick. In 1917, clay animation pioneer Helena Smith-Dayton referred to the principle behind her work as "stop action", a synonym of "stop motion".

French trick film pioneer Georges Méliès claimed to have invented the stop-trick and popularized it by using it in many of his short films. He reportedly used stop-motion animation in 1899 to produce moving letterforms.

==== Segundo de Chomón ====
Julienne Mathieu in a stop motion/pixilation scene from Hôtel électrique (1908)

Spanish filmmaker Segundo de Chomón (1871–1929) made many trick films in France for Pathé. He has often been compared to Georges Méliès as he also made many fantasy films with stop tricks and other illusions (helped by his wife, Julienne Mathieu).

Le théâtre de Bob (March 1906) features stop motion with dolls and objects to represent a fictional automated theatre owned by Bob, played by a live-action child actor. The film used to be credited to De Chomón, but this has been disputed since new research proved that he wasn't in Paris during the film's production. Direction and special effects have also been attributed to Gaston Velle. De Chomon more likely directed the similar 1909 short Le théâtre électrique de Bob.

La Maison ensorcelée (1906 or 1907)

De Chomón's La maison ensorcelée (December 1907) features stop-motion-animated cutlery and food, among other special effects that depict paranormal activity.

The Sculptor's Nightmare (1908)

De Chomón's Sculpteur moderne was released on 31 January 1908 and features heaps of clay molding itself into detailed sculptures that are capable of minor movements. The final sculpture depicts an old woman and walks around before it's picked up, squashed and molded back into a sitting old lady.

==== Edwin S. Porter and Wallace McCutcheon Sr. ====
American film pioneer Edwin S. Porter filmed a single-shot "lightning sculpting" film with a baker molding faces from a patch of dough in Fun in a Bakery Shop (1902), considered as foreshadowing of clay animation.

In 1905, Porter showed animated letters and very simple cutout animation of two hands in the intertitles in How Jones Lost His Roll.

Porter experimented with a small bit of crude stop-motion animation in his trick film Dream of a Rarebit Fiend (1906).

The "Teddy" Bears (2 March 1907), made in collaboration with Wallace McCutcheon Sr., mainly shows people in bear costumes, but the short film also features a short stop motion segment with small teddy bears.

On 15 February 1908, Porter released the trick film A Sculptor's Welsh Rabbit Dream that featured clay molding itself into three complete busts. No copy of the film has yet been located. It was soon followed by the similar extant film The Sculptor's Nightmare (6 May 1908) by Wallace McCutcheon Sr.

==== J. Stuart Blackton ====
J. Stuart Blackton's The Haunted Hotel (23 February 1907) featured a combination of live-action with practical special effects and stop-motion animation of several objects, a puppet and a model of the haunted hotel. It was the first stop-motion film to receive wide scale appreciation. Especially a large close-up view of a table being set by itself baffled viewers; there were no visible wires or other noticeable well-known tricks. This inspired other filmmakers, including French animator Émile Cohl and Segundo de Chomón. De Chomón would release the similar short films The House of Ghosts (La maison ensorcelée) in 1907 and Hôtel électrique in 1908, with the latter also containing some very early pixilation.

The Humpty Dumpty Circus (1908, considered lost) by Blackton and his British-American Vitagraph partner Albert E. Smith showed an animated performance of figures from a popular wooden toy set. Smith would later claim that this was "the first stop motion picture in America". The inspiration would have come from seeing how puffs of smoke behaved in the interrupted recordings for a stop trick film they were making. Smith would have suggested to get a patent for the technique, but Blackton thought it wasn't that important. Smith's recollections are not considered to be very reliable.

==== Émile Cohl ====
Émile Cohl's Japon de fantaisie (1907)

Blackton's The Haunted Hotel made a big impression in Paris, where it was released as L'hôtel hanté: fantasmagorie épouvantable. When Gaumont bought a copy to further distribute the film, it was carefully studied by some of their filmmakers to find out how it was made. Reportedly it was newcomer Émile Cohl who unraveled the mystery. Not long after, Cohl released his first film, Japon de fantaisie (June 1907), featuring his own imaginative use of the stop motion technique. It was followed by the revolutionary hand-drawn Fantasmagorie (17 August 1908) and many more animated films by Cohl.

Other notable stop-motion films by Cohl include Les allumettes animées (Animated Matches) (1908), and Mobilier fidèle (1910, in collaboration with Romeo Bosetti). Mobilier fidèle is often confused with Bosetti's object animation tour de force Le garde-meubles automatique (The Automatic Moving Company) (1912). Both films feature furniture moving by itself.

==== Arthur Melbourne-Cooper ====
Of the more than 300 short films produced between 1896 and 1915 by British film pioneer Arthur Melbourne-Cooper, an estimated 36 contained forms of animation. Based on later reports by Melbourne-Cooper and by his daughter Audrey Wadowska, some believe that Cooper's Matches: an Appeal was produced in 1899 and therefore the first stop-motion animation. The extant black-and-white film shows a matchstick figure writing an appeal to donate a Guinea for which Bryant & May would supply soldiers with sufficient matches. No archival records are known that could prove that the film was indeed created in 1899 during the beginning of the Second Boer War. Others place it at 1914, during the beginning of World War I. Cooper created more Animated Matches scenes in the same setting. These are believed to also have been produced in 1899, while a release date of 1908 has also been given. The 1908 Animated Matches film by Émile Cohl may have caused more confusion about the release dates of Cooper's matchstick animations. It also raises the question whether Cohl may have been inspired by Melbourne-Cooper or vice versa.

Melbourne-Cooper's lost films Dolly’s Toys (1901) and The Enchanted Toymaker (1904) may have included stop-motion animation. Dreams of Toyland (1908) features a scene with many animated toys that lasts approximately three and a half minutes.

==== Alexander Shiryaev ====
As a means to plan his performances, ballet dancer and choreographer Alexander Shiryaev started making approximately 20- to 25-centimeter-tall puppets out of papier-mâché on poseable wire frames. He then sketched all the sequential movements on paper. When he arranged these vertically on a long strip, it was possible to give a presentation of the complete dance with a home cinema projector. Later on, he bought a movie camera and between 1906 and 1909 he made many short films, including puppet animations. As a dancer and choreographer, Shiryaev had a special talent to create motion in his animated films. According to animator Peter Lord his work was decades ahead of its time. Part of Shiryaev's animation work is featured in Viktor Bocharov's documentary Alexander Shiryaev: A Belated Premiere (2003).

==== Ladislas Starevich (Russian period) ====
Polish-Russian Ladislas Starevich (1882–1965), started his film career around 1909 in Kaunas filming live insects. He wanted to document rutting stag beetles, but the creatures wouldn't cooperate or would even die under the bright lamps needed for filming. He solved the problem by using wire for the limbs of dried beetles and then animating them in stop-motion. The resulting short film, presumably 1 minute long, was probably titled by the Latin name for the species: Lucanus Cervus (Жук-олень, 1910, considered lost).

Starewicz' The Beautiful Leukanida (1912)

After moving to Moscow, Starevich continued animating dead insects, but now as characters in imaginative stories with much dramatic complexity. He garnered much attention and international acclaim with these short films, including the 10-minute The Beautiful Leukanida (Прекрасная Люканида, или Война усачей с рогачами) (March 1912), the two-minute Happy Scenes from Animal Life (Веселые сценки из жизни животных), the 12-minute The Cameraman's Revenge (Прекрасная Люканида, или Война усачей с рогачами, October 1912) and the 5-minute The Grasshopper and the Ant (Стрекоза и муравей, 1913). Reportedly many viewers were impressed with how much could be achieved with trained insects, or at least wondered what tricks could have been used, since few people were familiar with the secrets of stop-motion animation. The Insects' Christmas (Рождество обитателей леса, 1913) featured other animated puppets, including Father Christmas and a frog. Starevich made several other stop-motion films in the next two years, but mainly went on to direct live-action short and feature films before he fled from Russia in 1918.

==== Willis O'Brien's early films ====
The Dinosaur and the Missing Link (1915)

Excerpt from The Lost World (1925); animation by Willis O'Brien

Willis O' Brien's first stop-motion film was The Dinosaur and the Missing Link: A Prehistoric Tragedy (1915). Apart from the titular dinosaur and "missing link" ape, it featured several cavemen and an ostrich-like "desert quail", all relatively lifelike models made with clay. This led to a series of short animated comedies with a prehistoric theme for Edison Company, including Prehistoric Poultry (1916), R.F.D. 10,000 B.C. (1917), The Birth of a Flivver (1917) and Curious Pets of Our Ancestors (1917). O'Brien was then hired by producer Herbert M. Dawley to direct, create effects, co-write and co-star with him for The Ghost of Slumber Mountain (1918). The collaborative film combined live-action with animated dinosaur models in a 45-minute film, but after the premiere it was cut down to approximately 12 minutes. Dawley did not give O'Brien credits for the visual effects, and instead claimed the animation process as his own invention and even applied for patents. O'Brien's stop motion work was recognized as a technique to create lifelike creatures for adventure films. O' Brien further pioneered the technique with animated dinosaur sequences for the live-action feature The Lost World (1925).

==== Helena Smith Dayton ====
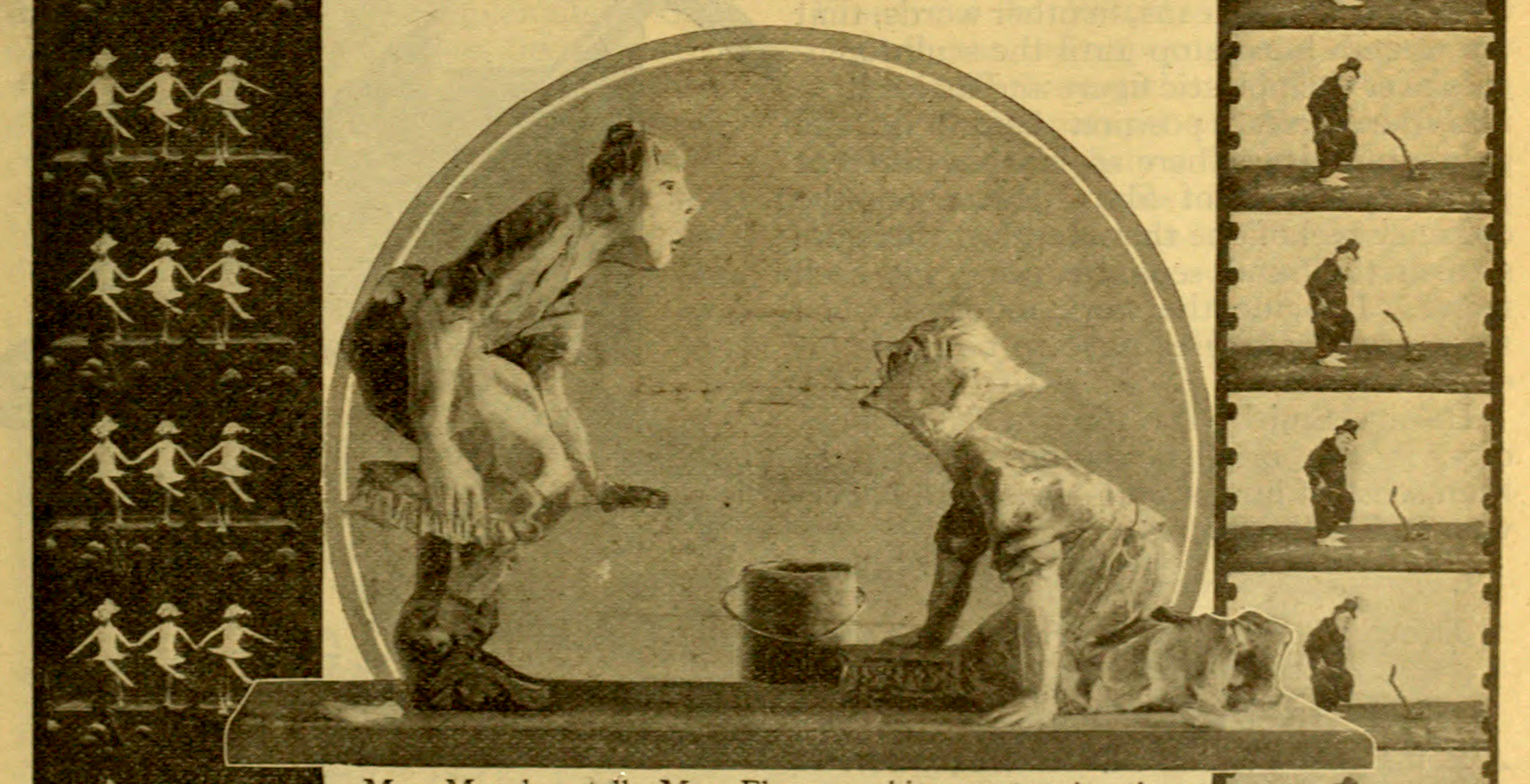
Stills from Battle of the Suds and other Helena Smith-Dayton films (1917)

New York artist Helena Smith Dayton, possibly the first female animator, had much success with her "Caricatypes" clay statuettes before she began experimenting with clay animation. Some of her first resulting short films were screened on 25 March 1917. She released an adaptation of William Shakespeare's Romeo and Juliet approximately half a year later. Although the films and her technique received much attention of the press, it seems she did not continue making films after she returned to New York from managing a YMCA in Paris around 1918. None of her films have yet surfaced, but the extant magazine articles have provided several stills and approximately 20 poorly printed frames from two film strips.

==== Starewicz in Paris ====
By 1920 Starewicz had settled in Paris, and started making new stop-motion films. Dans les Griffes de L'araignée (finished 1920, released 1924) featured detailed hand-made insect puppets that could convey facial expressions with moving lips and eyelids.

==== Other silent stop motion ====
One of the earliest clay animation films was Modelling Extraordinary, which impressed audiences in 1912.

The early Italian feature film Cabiria (1914) featured some stop motion techniques.

=== 1930s and 1940s ===
Starewicz finished the first feature stop-motion film Le Roman de Renard (The Tale of the Fox) in 1930, but problems with its soundtrack delayed its release. In 1937, it was released with a German soundtrack and in 1941 with its French soundtrack.

Hungarian-American filmmaker George Pal developed his own stop motion technique of replacing wooden dolls (or parts of them) with similar figures displaying changed poses and/or expressions. He called it Pal-Doll and used it for his Puppetoons films since 1932. The particular replacement animation method itself also became better known as puppetoon. In Europe he mainly worked on promotional films for companies such as Philips. Later Pal gained much success in Hollywood with a string of Academy Award for Best Animated Short Films, including Rhythm in the Ranks (1941), Tulips Shall Grow (1942), Jasper and the Haunted House (1942), the Dr. Seuss penned The 500 Hats of Bartholomew Cubbins (1943) and And to Think That I Saw It on Mulberry Street (1944), Jasper and the Beanstalk (1945), John Henry and the Inky-Poo (1946), Jasper in a Jam (1946), and Tubby the Tuba (1947). Many of his puppetoon films were selected for preservation in the United States National Film Registry.

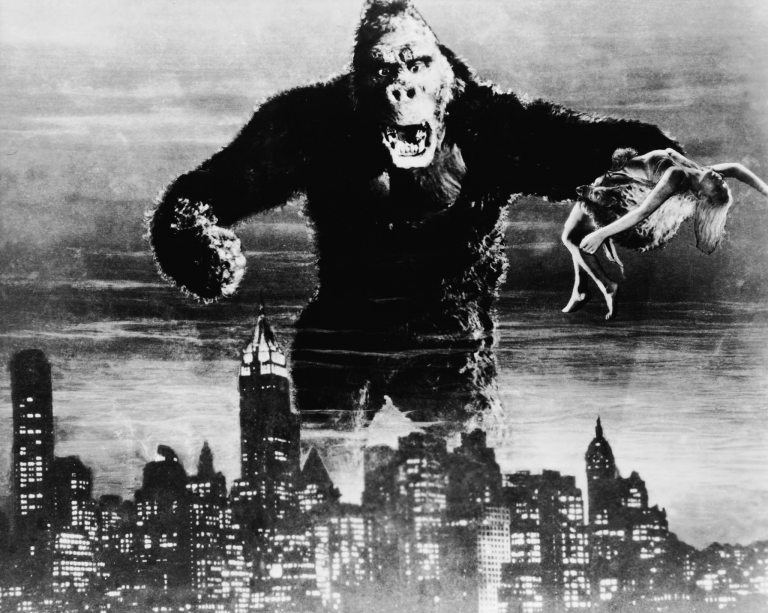
1933's King Kong used stop motion to bring to life a monstrous ape that interacted with human actors.

Willis O' Brien's expressive and emotionally convincing animation of the big ape in King Kong (1933) is widely regarded as a milestone in stop-motion animation and a highlight of Hollywood cinema in general.

In 1935, The New Gulliver, a Soviet stop motion-animated cartoon, made an extensive use of puppet animation, running almost all the way through the film (it begins and ends with short live-action sequences). The film was released to widespread acclaim and earned director Aleksandr Ptushko a special prize at the International Cinema Festival in Milan.

A 1940 promotional film for Autolite, an automotive parts supplier, featured stop-motion animation of its products marching past Autolite factories to the tune of Franz Schubert's Military March. An abbreviated version of this sequence was later used in television ads for Autolite, especially those on the 1950s CBS program Suspense, which Autolite sponsored.

The first British animated feature was the stop motion instruction film Handling Ships (1945) by Halas and Batchelor for the British Admiralty. It was not meant for general cinemas, but did become part of the official selection of the 1946 Cannes Film Festival.

The first Belgian animated feature was an adaptation of the Tintin comic The Crab with the Golden Claws (1947) with animated puppets.

The first Czech animated feature was the package film The Czech Year (1947) with animated puppets by Jiří Trnka. The film won several awards at the Venice Film Festival and other international festivals. Trnka would make several more award-winning stop motion features including The Emperor's Nightingale (1949), Prince Bayaya (1950), Old Czech Legends (1953), or A Midsummer Night's Dream (1959). He also directed many short films and experimented with other forms of animation.

=== 1950s ===
Gumbasia (1955) by Art Clokey

Ray Harryhausen learned under O'Brien on the film Mighty Joe Young (1949). Harryhausen would go on to create many memorable stop motion effects for a string of successful fantasy films over the next three decades. These included The Beast from 20,000 Fathoms (1953), It Came from Beneath the Sea (1955), The 7th Voyage of Sinbad (1958), Jason and the Argonauts (1963), The Golden Voyage of Sinbad (1973), and Clash of the Titans (1981).

It wasn't until 1954 before a feature animated film with a technique other than cel animation was produced in the US. The first was the stop motion adaptation of 19th century composer Engelbert Humperdinck's opera Hänsel und Gretel as Hansel and Gretel: An Opera Fantasy.

In 1955, Karel Zeman made his first feature film Journey to the Beginning of Time inspired by Jules Verne, featuring stop-motion animation of dinosaurs and other prehistoric creatures.

Art Clokey started his adventures in clay with a freeform clay short film called Gumbasia (1955), which shortly thereafter propelled him into the production of his more structured TV series Gumby (1955–1989), with the iconic titular character. In partnership with the United Lutheran Church in America, he also produced Davey and Goliath (1960–2004). The theatrical feature Gumby: The Movie (1992, released in 1995) was a box-office bomb.

In Hungary, Hungarian–French puppet designer and animated film director, Éva Balla‑Falus, began her series of 6 animated films with various collaborators (with the sculptor Zoltán Olcsai-Kiss, Megy a juhász szamáron in 1948, and Vitamin ABC in 1950, Kacsa in 1951, Balkéz Tóbiás in 1953, Mese a mihaszna köcsögről in 1956, and A didergő király in 1957.

On 22 November 1959, the first episode of Unser Sandmänchen (Our Little Sandman) was broadcast on DFF (East German television). The 10-minute daily bedtime show for young children features the title character as an animated puppet, and other puppets in different segments. A very similar Sandmänchen series, possibly conceived earlier, ran on West German television from 1 December 1959 until the German reunification in 1989. The East German show was continued on other German networks when DFF ended in 1991, and is one of the longest running animated series in the world. The theatrical feature Das Sandmännchen – Abenteuer im Traumland (2010) was fully animated with stop-motion puppets.

=== 1960s and 1970s ===
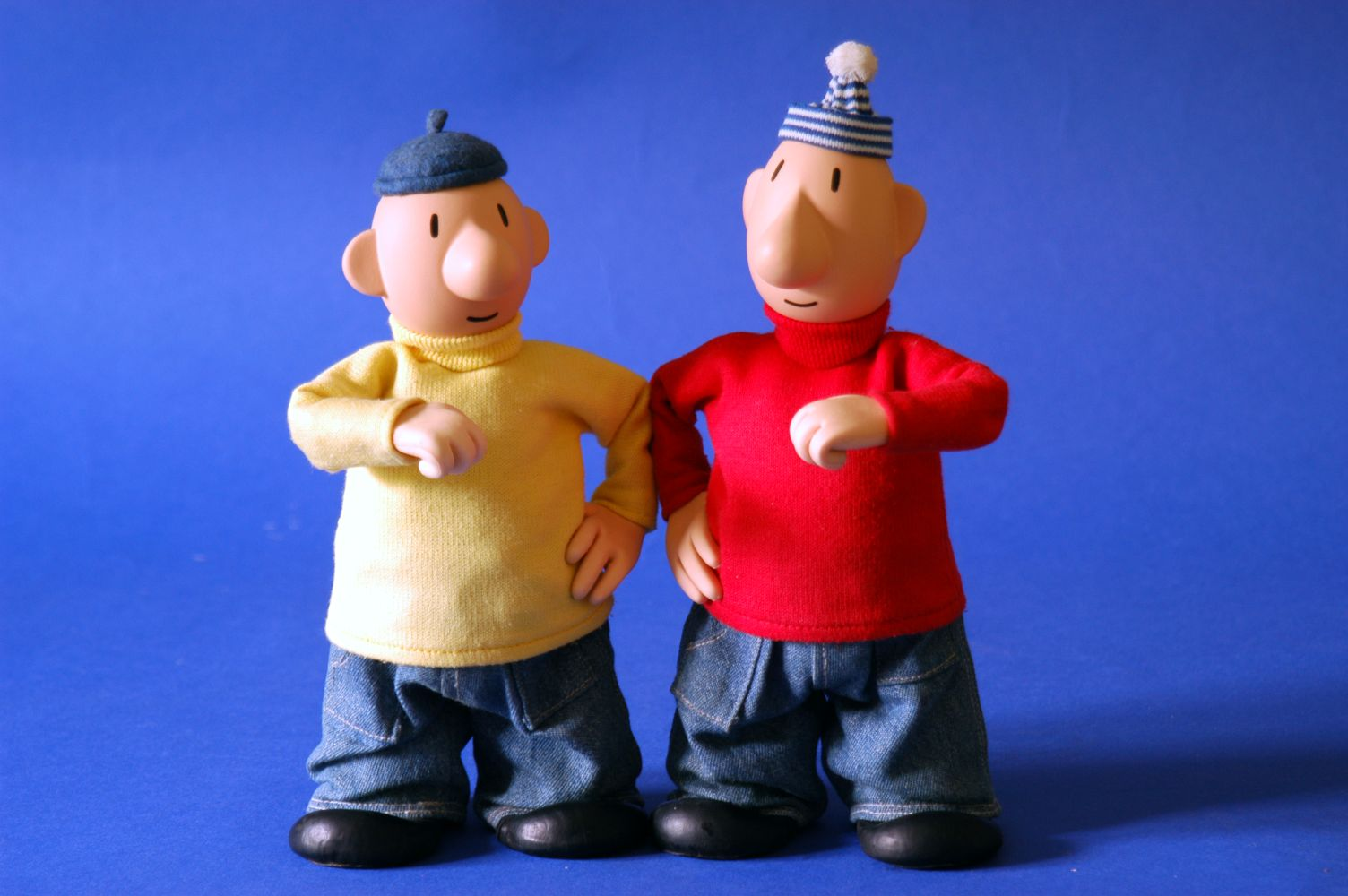
Pat & Mat, two inventive but clumsy neighbors, were introduced in 1976, while the first made-for-TV episode Tapety (translated Wallpaper) was produced in 1979 for ČST Bratislava.

Japanese puppet animator Tadahito Mochinaga started out as assistant animator in short anime (propaganda) films Arichan (1941) and Momotarō no Umiwashi (1943). He fled to Manchukuo during the war and stayed in China afterwards. Due to the scarcity of paint and film stock shortly after the war, Mochinaga decided to work with puppets and stop motion. His work helped popularize puppet animation in China, before he returned to Japan around 1953 where he continued working as animation director. In the 1960s, Mochinaga supervised the "Animagic" puppet animation for productions by Arthur Rankin Jr. and Jules Bass' Videocraft International, Ltd. (later called Rankin/Bass Productions, Inc.) and Dentsu, starting with the syndicated television series The New Adventures of Pinocchio (1960-1961). The Christmas TV special Rudolph the Red-Nosed Reindeer has been telecasted annually since 1964 and has become one of the most beloved holiday specials in the United States. They made three theatrical feature films Willy McBean and His Magic Machine (1965), The Daydreamer (1966, stop motion / live-action) and Mad Monster Party? (1967), and the television special Ballad of Smokey the Bear (1966) before the collaboration ended. Rankin/Bass worked with other animators for more TV specials, with titles such as The Little Drummer Boy (1968), Santa Claus is Comin' to Town (1970) and Here Comes Peter Cottontail (1971).

British television has shown many stop motion series for young children since the 1960s. An early example is Snip and Snap (1960-1961) by John Halas in collaboration with Danish paper sculptor Thok Søndergaard (Thoki Yenn), featuring dog Snap, cut from a sheet of paper by pair of scissors Snip.

Apart from their cutout animation series, British studio Smallfilms (Peter Firmin and Oliver Postgate) produced several stop motion series with puppets, beginning with Pingwings (1961-1965) featuring penguin-like birds knitted by Peter's wife Joan and filmed on their farm (where most of their productions were filmed in an unused barn). It was followed by Pogles' Wood (1965-1967), Clangers (1969-1972, 1974, revived in 2015), Bagpuss (1974) and Tottie: The Story of a Doll's House (1984).

Czech surrealist filmmaker Jan Švankmajer's released his short artistic films since 1964, which usually contain much experimental stop motion. He started to gain much international recognition in the 1980s. Since 1988 he has mostly been directing feature films which feature much more live action than stop motion. These include Alice, an adaptation of Lewis Carroll's Alice's Adventures in Wonderland, and Faust, a rendition of the legend of the German scholar. Švankmajer's work has been highly influential on other artists, such as Terry Gilliam and the Quay brothers (although the latter claim to have only discovered Švankmajer's films after having developed their own similar style).

French animator Serge Danot created The Magic Roundabout (1965) which played for many years on the BBC.

Polish studio Se-ma-for produced popular TV series with animated puppets in adaptations of Colargol (Barnaby the Bear in the UK, Jeremy in Canada) (1967-1974) and The Moomins (1977-1982).

In the 1960s and 1970s, independent clay animator Eliot Noyes Jr. refined the technique of "free-form" clay animation with his Oscar-nominated 1965 film Clay (or the Origin of Species). Noyes also used stop motion to animate sand lying on glass for his musical animated film Sandman (1975).

Italian director Francesco Misseri created the clay animation TV series Mio Mao (1970-1976, 2002–2007), The Red and the Blue (Il Rosso e il Blu, 1976), and a TV series with an animated origami duck Quaq Quao (1978-1979).

The British artists Brian Cosgrove and Mark Hall (Cosgrove Hall Films) produced two stop-motion animated adaptions of Enid Blyton's Noddy book series, including the original series of the same name (1975–1982) and Noddy's Toyland Adventures (1992–2001), a full-length film The Wind in the Willows (1983) and later a multi-season TV series, both based on Kenneth Grahame's classic children's book of the same title. They also produced a documentary of their production techniques, Making Frog and Toad.

In 1975, filmmaker and clay animation experimenter Will Vinton joined with sculptor Bob Gardiner to create an experimental film called Closed Mondays which became the first stop-motion film to win an Oscar. Will Vinton followed with several other successful short film experiments including The Great Cognito, The Creation, and Rip Van Winkle which were each nominated for Academy Awards. In 1977, Vinton made a documentary about this process and his style of animation which he dubbed "claymation"; he titled the documentary Claymation. Soon after this documentary, the term was trademarked by Vinton to differentiate his team's work from others who had been, or were beginning to do, "clay animation". While the word has stuck and is often used to describe clay animation and stop motion, it remains a trademark owned currently by Laika Entertainment, Inc. Twenty clay-animation episodes featuring the clown Mr. Bill were a feature of Saturday Night Live, starting from a first appearance in February 1976.

At very much the same time in the UK, Peter Lord and David Sproxton formed Aardman Animations that would produce many commercials, TV series, short films and eventually also feature films. In 1976, they created the character Morph who appeared as an animated side-kick to the TV presenter Tony Hart on his BBC TV programme Take Hart. The five-inch-high presenter was made from a traditional British modelling clay called Plasticine. In 1977, they started on a series of animated films, again using modelling clay, but this time made for a more adult audience. The soundtrack for Down and Out was recorded in a Salvation Army Hostel and Plasticine puppets were animated to dramatise the dialogue. A second film, also for the BBC followed in 1978. A TV series The Amazing Adventures of Morph was aired in 1980.

Sand-coated puppet animation was used in the Oscar-winning 1977 film The Sand Castle, produced by Dutch-Canadian animator Co Hoedeman. Hoedeman was one of dozens of animators sheltered by the National Film Board of Canada, a Canadian government film arts agency that had supported animators for decades. A pioneer of refined multiple stop-motion films under the NFB banner was Norman McLaren, who brought in many other animators to create their own creatively controlled films. Notable among these are the pinscreen animation films of Jacques Drouin, made with the original pinscreen donated by Alexandre Alexeieff and Claire Parker.

Czech filmmakers Lubomír Beneš and Vladimír Jiránek debuted their animated puppet characters Pat & Mat, two inventive but clumsy neighbors, in the 7-minute short Kuťáci in 1976. Since 1979, over 100 episodes have been broadcast irregularly. Since 2014, new episodes were presented in theatrically released package films. The series became very popular in several countries, especially in The Netherlands, the only country where the characters are voiced.

One of the main British animation teams, John Hardwick and Bob Bura, were the main animators in many early British TV shows, and are famous for their work on the Trumptonshire trilogy (Camberwick Green, Trumpton and Chigley). Their company was named Stop Motion Limited, the term having been their trademark until it became generic.

Disney experimented with several stop-motion techniques by hiring independent animator-director Mike Jittlov to make the first stop-motion animation of Mickey Mouse toys ever produced, in a short sequence called Mouse Mania, part of a TV special, Mickey's 50, which commemorated Mickey's 50th anniversary in 1978. Jittlov again produced some impressive multi-technique stop-motion animation a year later for a 1979 Disney special promoting their release of the feature film The Black Hole. Titled Major Effects, Jittlov's work stood out as the best part of the special. Jittlov released his footage the following year to 16mm film collectors as a short film titled The Wizard of Speed and Time, along with four of his other short multi-technique animated films, most of which eventually evolved into his own feature-length film of the same title. Effectively demonstrating almost all animation techniques, as well as how he produced them, the film was released to theaters in 1987 and to video in 1989.

=== 1980s ===
In the 1970s and 1980s, Industrial Light & Magic often used stop-motion model animation in such films as the original Star Wars trilogy: the holochess sequence in Star Wars, the Tauntauns and AT-AT walkers in The Empire Strikes Back, and the AT-ST walkers in Return of the Jedi were all filmed using stop-motion animation, with the latter two films utilising go motion: an invention from renowned visual effects veteran Phil Tippett. The many shots including the ghosts in Raiders of the Lost Ark, the Dragon in Dragonslayer, and the first two feature films in the RoboCop series use Tippett's go motion.

In the UK, Aardman Animations continued to grow. Channel 4 funded a new series of clay animated films, Conversation Pieces, using recorded soundtracks of real people talking. A further series in 1986, called Lip Sync, premiered the work of Richard Goleszowski (Ident), Barry Purves (Next), and Nick Park (Creature Comforts), as well as further films by Sproxton and Lord. Creature Comforts won the Oscar for Best Animated Short in 1990. In 1986, they also produced a notable music video for "Sledgehammer", a song by Peter Gabriel.

In 1980, Marc Paul Chinoy directed the 1st feature-length clay animated film, based on the famous Pogo comic strip. Titled I go Pogo. It was aired a few times on American cable channels but has yet to be commercially released. Primarily clay, some characters required armatures, and walk cycles used pre-sculpted hard bases legs.

Stop motion was also used for some shots of the final sequence of the first Terminator movie, also for the scenes of the small alien ships in Batteries Not Included in 1987, animated by David W. Allen. Allen's stop motion work can also be seen in such feature films as The Crater Lake Monster (1977), Q - The Winged Serpent (1982), The Gate (1987), and Freaked (1993). Allen's King Kong Volkswagen commercial from the 1970s is now legendary among model animation enthusiasts.

In 1985, Will Vinton and his team released an ambitious feature film in stop motion called "The Adventures Of Mark Twain" based on the life and works of the famous American author. While the film may have been a little sophisticated for young audiences at the time, it got rave reviews from critics and adults in general. Vinton's team also created the Nomes and the Nome King for Disney's "Return to Oz" feature, for which they received an Academy Award Nomination for Special Visual Effects. In the late 1980s and early 1990s, Will Vinton became very well known for his commercial work as well with stop motion campaigns including The California Raisins and The Noid.

Jiří Barta released his award-winning fantasy film The Pied Piper (1986).

From 1986 to 1991, Churchill Films produced The Mouse and the Motorcycle, Runaway Ralph, and Ralph S. Mouse for ABC television. The shows featured stop-motion characters combined with live action, based on the books of Beverly Cleary. John Clark Matthews was the animation director, with Justin Kohn, Joel Fletcher, and Gail Van Der Merwe providing character animation. The company also produced other films based on children's books.

From 1986 to 2000, over 150 five-minute episodes of Pingu, a Swiss children's comedy, were produced by Trickfilmstudio.

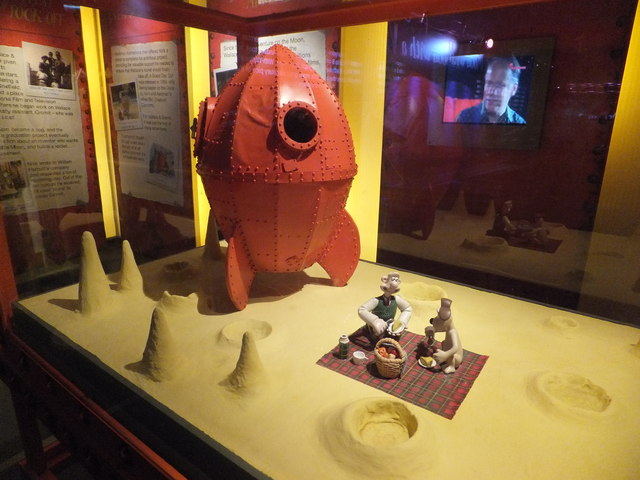
1989's A Grand Day Out introduced Nick Park's famous Wallace & Gromit characters, which are still animated in stop motion for all television and film appearances.

Aardman Animations' Nick Park became very successful with his short claymation Creature Comforts in 1989, which had talking animals voicing vox pop interviews. Park then used the same format to produce a series of commercials between 1990 and 1992. The commercials have been credited as having introduced a more "caring" way of advertising in the UK. Richard Goleszowski later directed two 13-episode Creature Comforts TV series (2003, 2005–2006) and a Christmas special (2005).

Also in 1989, Park introduced his very popular clay characters Wallace & Gromit in A Grand Day Out. Three more short films and two feature films, and multiple spin-offs would follow. Among many other awards, Park won the Academy Award for Best Animated Feature for the feature-length outing Wallace & Gromit: The Curse of the Were-Rabbit. Park also worked on the Chicken Run movie, which was another film from Aardman Animations.

=== 1990s ===
In 1992, Trey Parker and Matt Stone made The Spirit of Christmas, a short cutout animated student film made with construction paper. In 1995 they made a second short with the same titled, commissioned as a Christmas greeting by Fox Broadcasting Company executive Brian Graden. The concepts and characters were further developed into the TV hit series South Park (since 1997). Except for the pilot, all animation has been created on computers in the same style.

The Nightmare Before Christmas (1993), directed by Henry Selick and produced by Tim Burton, was one of the more widely released stop-motion features and became the highest grossing stop-motion animated movie of its time, grossing over $50 million domestic. Henry Selick also went on to direct James and the Giant Peach and Coraline, and Tim Burton went on to direct Corpse Bride and Frankenweenie.

The stop-motion feature The Secret Adventures of Tom Thumb was released in 1993.

In November 1998, the first episode of Bob the Builder released on BBC. Bob the Builder was a popular British stop-motion television series created by Keith Chapman & produced and owned by HIT Entertainment.

In 1999, Will Vinton launched the first US prime-time stop-motion television series called The PJs, co-created by actor-comedian Eddie Murphy. The Emmy-winning sitcom aired on Fox for two seasons, then moved to the WB for an additional season. Vinton launched another series, Gary & Mike, for UPN in 2001.

In 1999, Tsuneo Gōda directed 30-second sketches of the character Domo. The shorts, animated by stop-motion studio Dwarf, are currently still produced in Japan and have received universal critical acclaim from fans and critics. Gōda also directed the stop-motion movie series Komaneko in 2004.

=== 21st century ===
The music video to "Green" (2018) by Cavetown, a modern example of stop-motion animation

The BBC commissioned thirteen episodes of stop frame animated Summerton Mill in 2004 as inserts into their flagship pre-school program, Tikkabilla. Created and produced by Pete Bryden and Ed Cookson, the series was then given its own slot on BBC1 and BBC2 and has been broadcast extensively around the world.

Other notable stop-motion feature films released since 2000 include Fantastic Mr. Fox (2009), Coraline (2009), $9.99 (2009), Hell and Back (2015), Anomalisa (2015), Isle of Dogs (2018), Alien Xmas (2020), Wendell & Wild (2022), and Guillermo del Toro's Pinocchio (2022).

In 2003, the pilot film for the series Curucuru and Friends, produced by Korean studio Ffango Entertoyment is greenlighted into a children's animated series in 2004 after an approval with the Gyeonggi Digital Contents Agency. It was aired in KBS1 on November 24, 2006, and won the 13th Korean Animation Awards in 2007 for Best Animation. Ffango Entertoyment also worked with Frontier Works in Japan to produce the 2010 film remake of Cheburashka.

Since 2005, Robot Chicken has mostly utilized stop-motion animation, using custom made action figures and other toys as principal characters.

Since 2009, Laika, the stop motion successor to Will Vinton Studios, has released six feature films, which have collectively grossed over $400 million: Coraline (2009), ParaNorman (2012), The Boxtrolls (2014), Kubo and the Two Strings (2016), Missing Link (2019), and Wildwood (2026).

Directors like Tim Burton and Wes Anderson are still using stop-motion animation in some of their live action films.

In 2019 and 2020, cinematographer Jeffrey Gardner won back-to-back Daytime Creative Arts Emmy Awards for Outstanding Cinematography on the stop-motion series Tumble Leaf (Amazon Studios), marking one of the rare instances where a director of photography has been recognized for work in stop-motion television. While stop-motion histories often highlight animators and directors, Gardner’s awards underscore the vital role of cinematography in the medium, where lighting, lenses, and miniature set design create the show’s distinctive visual storytelling.

In November 2024, Disney released Mickey & Minnie's Christmas Carols, a series of five stop motion shorts featuring Mickey, Minnie, Donald, Daisy, Goofy and Pluto.

== Variants ==
=== Stereoscopic ===
Stop motion has very rarely been shot in stereoscopic 3D throughout film history. The first 3D stop motion short was In Tune With Tomorrow (also known as Motor Rhythm), made in 1939 by John Norling. The second stereoscopic stop motion release was The Adventures of Sam Space in 1955 by Paul Sprunck. The third and latest stop motion short in stereoscopic 3D was The Incredible Invasion of the 20,000 Giant Robots from Outer Space in 2000 by Elmer Kaan and Alexander Lentjes. This is also the first ever 3D stereoscopic stop motion and CGI short in the history of film. The first all stop-motion 3D feature is Coraline (2009), based on Neil Gaiman's best-selling novel and directed by Henry Selick. Another recent example is the Nintendo 3DS video software which came with the option for Stop-Motion videos. This was released December 8, 2011 as a 3DS system update. Also, the film ParaNorman is in 3D stop motion.

=== Go motion ===
Another more complicated variation on stop motion is go motion, co-developed by Phil Tippett and first used on the films The Empire Strikes Back (1980), Dragonslayer (1981), and the RoboCop films. Go motion involved programming a computer to move parts of a model slightly during each exposure of each frame of film, combined with traditional hand manipulation of the model in between frames, to produce a more realistic motion blurring effect. Tippett also used the process extensively in his 1984 short film Prehistoric Beast, a 10 minutes long sequence depicting a herbivorous dinosaur (Monoclonius), being chased by a carnivorous one (Tyrannosaurus). With new footage Prehistoric Beast became Dinosaur! in 1985, a full-length dinosaurs documentary hosted by Christopher Reeve. Those Phil Tippett's go motion tests acted as motion models for his first photo-realistic use of computers to depict dinosaurs in Jurassic Park in 1993. A low-tech, manual version of this blurring technique was originally pioneered by Władysław Starewicz in the silent era, and was used in his feature film The Tale of the Fox (1931).

== Comparison to computer-generated imagery ==
The reasons for using stop motion instead of the more advanced computer-generated imagery (CGI) include the appeal of its distinct look and the notion that it accurately displays real-life textures, while CGI texturing can look more artificial and isn't always quite as close to realism. This is appreciated by a number of animation directors, such as Guillermo del Toro, Henry Selick, Tim Burton and Travis Knight.

Guillermo del Toro aimed to praise the benefits of stop motion in his movie Pinocchio, saying that he wanted "the expressiveness and the material nature of a handmade piece of animation — an artisanal, beautiful exercise in carving, painting, sculpting".

== Stop motion in other media ==
Many young people begin their experiments in movie making with stop-motion, thanks to the ease of modern stop-motion software and online video publishing.

Singer-songwriter Oren Lavie's music video for the song "Her Morning Elegance" was posted on YouTube on January 19, 2009. The video, directed by Lavie and Yuval and Merav Nathan, uses stop motion and has achieved great success with over 25.4 million views, also earning a 2010 Grammy Award nomination for "Best Short Form Music Video".

Stop motion has occasionally been used to create the characters for computer games, as an alternative to CGI. The Virgin Interactive Entertainment Mythos game Magic and Mayhem (1998) featured creatures built by stop-motion specialist Alan Friswell, who made the miniature figures from modelling clay and latex rubber, over armatures of wire and ball-and-socket joints. The models were then animated one frame at a time, and incorporated into the CGI elements of the game through digital photography. ClayFighter for the Super NES and The Neverhood and Hylics 2 for the PC are other examples.

Scientists at IBM used a scanning tunneling microscope in 2013 to single out and move individual atoms which were used to make characters in A Boy and His Atom. This was the tiniest scale stop-motion video made at that time.

Replicating the distinct tactile look of traditional stop motion has gained popularity in contemporary media through the use of CGI. This approach can often provide a more cost-effective and accessible means of achieving the stop motion aesthetic. Noteworthy among such endeavors is the work of Blender animator Ian Worthington, exemplified by his 2021 short film "Captain Yajima". Another prominent example of this trend is The LEGO Movie, which uses CGI to replicate the visual style and imperfections of stop motion.

== See also ==
- Brickfilm – Type of animation using stop-motion
- List of stop motion artists
- List of stop motion films
- Still motion
- Time-lapse photography – Filming technique

== Bibliography ==
- Maltin, Leonard (2006). Leonard Maltin's Movie and Video Guide (2007 ed.). New York: Plume. ISBN 9780452287563. OCLC 70671727.
- Sibley, Brian (2000). Chicken Run: Hatching the Movie. New York: Abrams. ISBN 0810941244.
- Lord, Peter; Sibley, Brian (1998). Creating 3-D animation: The Aardman Book of Filmmaking. New York: Harry N. Abrams. ISBN 0810919966.
- Smith, Dave (1998). Disney A to Z: The Updated Official Encyclopedia (updated ed.). New York: Hyperion. ISBN 0786863919.
- Taylor, Richard (1996). Encyclopedia of Animation Techniques. Philadelphia: Running Press. ISBN 156138531X.
