= Eduardo Jimeno =

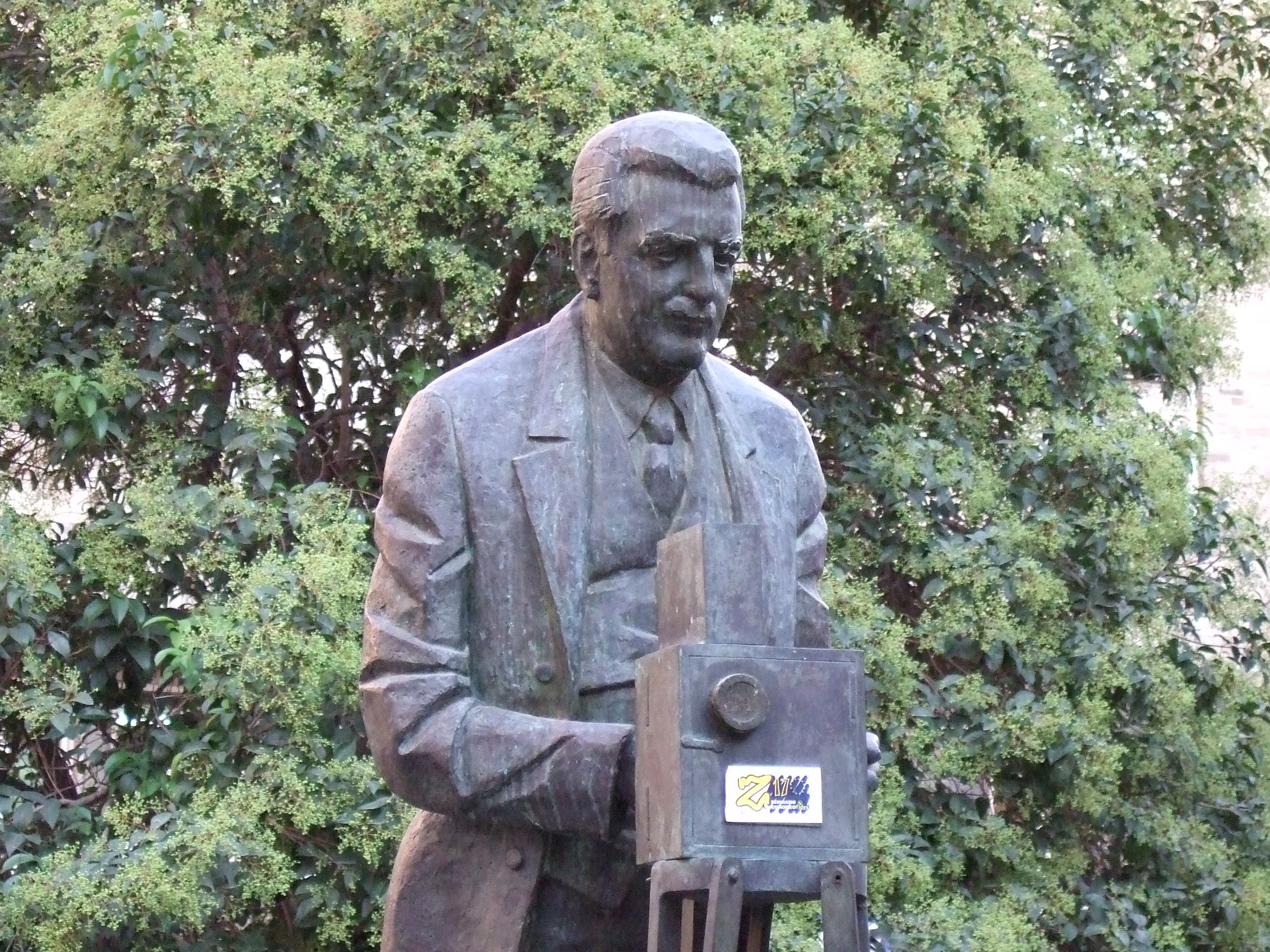
- Statue of Eduardo Jimeno in Zaragoza
- Born: Eduardo Jimeno Correas; 22 February 1870; Zaragoza, Spain
- Died: 30 October 1947 (aged 78); Madrid, Spain
- Occupation: Filmmaker

Eduardo Jimeno Correas (22 February 1870 in Zaragoza – 30 October 1947 in Madrid) was a Spanish filmmaker and producer. He is considered one of the pioneers in Spanish cinema.

In 1896 he acquired with his father, Eduardo Jimeno Peromarta, a Lumière camera in Lyon, which he later used to film the Fiestas del Pilar that same year. He fixed his camera on a balcony near the Basilica of Our Lady of the Pillar in Zaragoza and recorded "natural scenes" of the events on 11 and 19 October. From these recordings, he edited two short documentary films: Salida de la misa de doce de la Iglesia del Pilar de Zaragoza (widely considered the first Spanish film directed and produced by a Spaniard in the Iberian Peninsula, as Francis Doublier, a Lumière operator, had already filmed a bull fight in Spain by the end of 1895) and Saludos (1897).

Salida de la misa de doce de la Iglesia del Pilar de Zaragoza's film tape had a length of 12.4m, consisted of 651 stills and has a duration of less than a minute.

Both short films, Salida de la misa de doce de la Iglesia del Pilar de Zaragoza and Saludos, were restored in 1994 and sold at auction in 2004 to a person linked to the Institut Lumière for 129.000 euros.
