= First Prize for the Cello =

- Distributed by: Pathé
- Release date: 1907
- Running time: 3 minutes
- Country: France
- Languages: Silent film French (Original intertitles)

First Prize for the Cello is a French silent comedy directed by an anonymous director and released in 1907.

== Plot ==
A man walks along with a cello under his arm. He then sits down on a stool and proceeds to play it, very badly, while the neighbors proceed throw all manner of things at him to make him stop. At one point, a couch is thrown at him, but neither this nor any other projectile is a successful deterrent. At the end of the film, a girl comes up to him and gives him some flowers. The man then stops playing and walks off, happy that his talents have been recognized.
