= Arthur Melbourne-Cooper =

British filmmaker (1874–1961)

Arthur Melbourne Cooper
- Born: 15 April 1874; St Albans, England
- Died: 28 November 1961 (aged 87); Coton, England
- Occupations: Photographer; Filmmaker
- Spouse: Kate Lacey (1908–1961; his death)
- Children: Audrey Wadowska; 2 others

Arthur Melbourne Cooper (15 April 1874 – 28 November 1961) was a British photographer and early filmmaker best known for his pioneering work in stop-motion animation. He produced over three hundred films between 1896 and 1915, of which an estimated 36 were all or in part animated. These include Dreams of Toyland (1908) and according to some sources Dolly’s Toys (1901), as well as Matches: An Appeal (date disputed), which Dutch independent researcher Tjitte de Vries has claimed may have been the first animated film to be shown in public.

Since his death, Cooper has become a controversial figure among film historians, with disputes arising over his professional relationship with film pioneer Birt Acres; seven films known as the GRG-Series, which archives such as the BFI's currently credit to Brighton-based filmmaker George Albert Smith; and the re-dating of the aforementioned Matches: An Appeal, which archives such as the BFI's currently date to 1914. The claims were debated in a series of articles in Film History journal from 1999 to 2002, and in response to the book on Cooper published in 2009 by de Vries.

== Biography ==
=== Early life and career ===
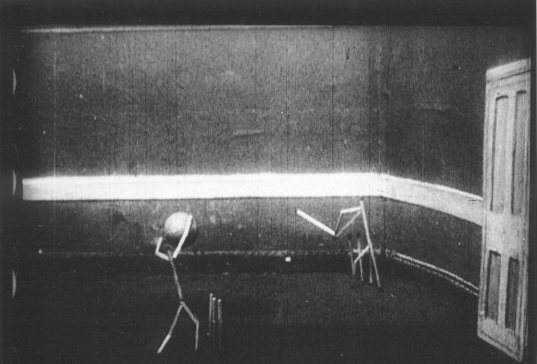
Animated Matches: Cricket

Born in St Albans, Cooper was the son of a local photographer Thomas M. Cooper, who educated him from very early on in his profession. By the age of 16, he was working as an assistant at his father's shop on New London Road, St Albans. He claimed to have gone to work for film pioneer Birt Acres in 1892, at the age of 18; this claim has however been disputed as Acres himself was working for Elliot and Sons up until 1895 and is felt unlikely to have hired an assistant before this time.

During the late 1890s and early 1900s, Cooper performed "rush work" filming and developing topical subjects, such as the 1898 launch of the Albion (for Acre), the 1902 Coronation of King Edward VII and Queen Alexandra (for the Biograph Company) and the 1903 Grand National among others.

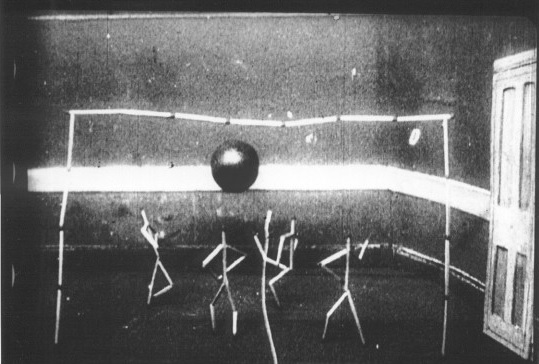
Animated Matches: Football

Dutch researcher Tjitte de Vries, based on later reports by Cooper and his daughter Audrey Wadowska, controversially claims that during this time the filmmaker also produced the Animated Matches series of films more commonly dated to 1914 and the GRG-Series of films more commonly attributed to George Albert Smith.

Continuing to live at London Road with his mother and siblings and work as a cameraman, he began to think about establishing his own company following his father's death in 1901.

=== Alpha Trading Company ===
MacNab's Visit to London

By 1906 Cooper had established the Alpha Trading Company, and started film production in his own right. His productions at this time include MacNab's Visit to London (1905), in which he plays the title role in a slapstick comedy about golf, and The Motor Pirate (1906), in which bandits in an armoured car make the roads unsafe. That year he also became one of the founder-members of the British Kinematograph Manufacturers Association.

In 1907 Cooper set out on a special observation car, attached to the front of a train, to film the 3,000 feet (910 m) long phantom ride film London to Killarney (1907) which was one of the longest to have been made at that time and was distributed in four parts. At the end of the ride he also filmed the comedy Irish Wives and English Husbands (1907), starring local girl Kate O'Connor, which was the first fiction film to be made in Ireland.

A Dream of Toyland

By 1908 Cooper had established the Alpha Production Works in St Albans. His productions during this time include his earliest uncontested animation Dreams of Toyland (1908), which includes storylines, themes, characters and techniques he would return to in later films. Earlier, contested, animated productions include Dolly’s Toys (1901), which has also been credited to Walter R. Booth and George Albert Smith, and the Animated Matches trilogy which has been variously dated to 1914 and 1899 by different researchers.

=== Alpha Picture House ===
On 27 July 1908, Cooper opened Hertfordshire's first permanent cinema, the Alpha Picture House, on London Road. The building designed by Percival Blow contained a restaurant, swimming pool and hairdressing salon as well as the 800 seat cinema, which has been described as the first cinema as we know them today. The cinema failed inspection following the passing of the 1910 Cinematograph Act, and was sold through liquidation to George Arthur Dawson the following year. The cinema continued to run as the Poly until 1926 and was destroyed by fire the following year. A new cinema was built on the London Road site, which continued in operation until the 1990s.

In February 1909, he visited Paris where he had been once or twice before on business, but this time to represent his Alpha Trading Company at the first international film congress, the Congrès International des Éditeurs du Film, in order to secure the rights of film producers. In the same year, encouraged by the success of his new cinema in St Albans, he opened a second Picture Palace in Letchworth. This was not a success in a town populated by church-going people who disliked the moving pictures. Two fires in the cinema got Cooper into serious financial difficulties.

=== Kinema Industries Ltd ===
After twelve years, Cooper folded up his businesses in St Albans and, with his wife and young children, he moved to Manor Park, Lee. During the day he made here a series of puppet animation pictures for Butcher's Empire Films, which had its studios at the back of his garden. One of his most acclaimed films was Cinderella (1912), which was distributed in hand-coloured versions. In the evenings Cooper, for a while, became manager of a new cinema in Harrow, paying his debts in St Albans.

With his assets of the Alpha Trading Company and capital of a semi-retired officer, Andrew Heron, Cooper established Heron Films Ltd., a company which set out to produce longer films, comedies and dramas, with the theatrical company of Mark Melford, a well-known actor in those days. Cooper also established Kinema Industries Ltd, for which he made several documentaries and newsreels, among which the notorious The Suffragette Derby of 1913 at Epsom, in which suffragette Emily Davison can be seen being trampled to death by the King's racing horse. It was filmed by Cooper with his camera at the finish and his brother Hubert at Tattenham Corner.

Both companies were wound up at the outbreak of the First World War when Andrew Heron reported himself for active service. Cooper became munition inspector in Luton, while the family lived nearby in Dunstable.

After the First World War, Cooper and his family moved to Blackpool where he became manager of Animads, a subdivision of Langford's Advertising Agency Ltd. He made a number of animated advertisements films. Among them: Cadbury's chocolates, Paddy Whiskey, Swiss Rolls, and Clean Milk Campaign.

=== Later life and death ===
Melbourne-Cooper retired in 1940 and moved to Coton, Cambridgeshire, where he died in 1961; he is buried in the cemetery of St Peter's Church, alongside his wife, who died in 1962.

== Legacy ==
In 1955, Audrey Wadowska, the daughter of Cooper, attended an exhibition on film history in London, where she saw stills from a series of films credited to Brighton-based film pioneer George Albert Smith, which she claimed contained members of her family and must therefore have been filmed by her father. The series is known as the GRG-Series, after Grandma's Reading Glass (1900); the significance of this particular film is its pioneering use of interpolated close-up. Wadowska's campaigning, championed by Dutch researcher Tjitte de Vries, has resulted in the films being re-attributed to Cooper by New York's Museum of Modern Art Film Archive, but other archives, including the BFI National Film and Television Archive, have not done the same.

Dutch researcher Tjitte de Vries has also championed the claim by Cooper and his daughter that the series of three stop-motion animation films that includes Matches: An Appeal (date disputed), was not produced in 1914 as previously suggested by study of the now lost original negative by curator of Harrow's Kodak Museum Dr. R.S. Schultze, and instead dates production to 1899; the significance of this is that it would predate any other known use of stop-motion animation techniques.

In 1996, the city of St Albans with the British Film Institute, to celebrate 100 years of British films, erected a plaque on a flat building at the corner of Alma Road and London Road, commemorating that Cooper once had on this spot his Alpha Cinematograph Works. Although the picture house that Cooper founded on London Road was destroyed by fire, the site continued to be used as a cinema when a new building was erected in 1931. Known variously as the Regent, the Capitol and the Odeon, the cinema remained in operation until it closed in 1995. The building was restored and re-opened in 2014 as The Odyssey Cinema.

== Filmography ==
Date	Title	Credited as				Notes
Date	Title	Cinematographer	Producer	Writer	Director	Notes
1901	Dolly’s Toys	Yes	Yes		Yes	trick film.
1902	Village Church Scene	Yes	Yes		Yes	Actuality.
1904	The Enchanted Toymaker	Yes	Yes		Yes	Fiction.
1905	Macnab's Visit to London a.k.a. MacNab's Visit to London	Yes	Yes		Yes	Comedy featuring Melbourne-Cooper.
1906	Motor Pirates	Yes	Yes		Yes	Crime chase film.
1907	Irish Wives and English Husbands	Yes	Yes		Yes	Film featuring Kate O'Connor.
1907	London to Killarney	Yes	Yes		Yes	Phantom ride on the train across Ireland.
1908	Animated Matches	Yes	Yes		Yes	Trick film featuring animated matches.
1908 (Note: Disputed date listed as 1907 in some sources.)	Dreams of Toyland a.k.a. A Dream of Toyland	Yes	Yes		Yes	Fantasy blending live action and stop-motion animation.
1908	Grandpa's Pension Day	Yes	Yes		Yes	Drama featuring an old man getting drunk, jailed and bailed.
1908	In the Land of Nod	Yes	Yes		Yes	Trick film mixing live action and animation.
1909	The Tale of the Ark	Yes	Yes		Yes	Animated drama.
190?	Policeman Beaten	Yes	Yes		Yes	Comedy.
1910 (Note: Disputed date listed as c.1905 in some sources.)	The Empire's Money Maker	Yes	Yes		Yes	Actuality inside the Royal Mint.
1911	Road Hogs in Toyland	Yes	Yes		Yes	Animated comedy.
1912	The Life of a Racing Pigeon	Yes	Yes		Yes	Documentary assisted by The Racing Pigeon magazine.
1912	The Manufacture of Walking Sticks	Yes	Yes		Yes	Documentary inside Henry Howell & Co.
1912	The Wooden Athletes	Yes	Yes		Yes	Animated film.
1914 (Note: Disputed date listed as 1899 in some sources.)	Animated Matches: Cricket a.k.a. Animated Matches Playing Cricket	Yes			Yes	Animated promotional film for Bryant & May matches.
1914 (Note: Disputed date listed as 1899 in some sources.)	Animated Matches: Football a.k.a. Animated Matches Playing Volleyball	Yes			Yes	Animated promotional film for Bryant & May matches.
1914 (Note: Disputed date listed as 1899 in some sources.)	Matches: An Appeal a.k.a. Matches Appeal	Yes			Yes	Animated wartime appeal commissioned by Bryant & May.
