= Satan s'amuse =

- Directed by: Segundo de Chomón
- Starring: Segundo de Chomón
- Release date: 1907
- Running time: 10 minutes 23 seconds
- Country: France
- Language: Silent

Satan s'amuse (Satán se divierte in Spanish, Satan at Play in English) is a 1907 French silent film directed by pioneer Segundo de Chomón. It is often confused with Le spectre rouge, notably in the IMDb database and subsequently in YouTube attributions.

== Plot ==
The Devil visits Earth on a magic elevator. He surprises two sewer workers, disguises himself, and spreads chaos: a quarrel with a coachman, an altercation with a police sergeant, the confusion for a barman and others. He is trapped in a cage with a young woman and returns to Hell. It is revealed that the young woman is, in fact, the jealous Madame Devil in disguise.

== Technical sheet ==
- English title: Satan is having fun
- Spanish title: Satán se divierte
- English alternative title: Satan at Play
- Production company: Pathé Frères
- Genre: Fantasy film
