= The House of Ghosts =

La maison ensorcelée
- Directed by: Segundo de Chomón
- Distributed by: Pathé Frères
- Release date: December 1907
- Running time: 6 minutes
- Country: France
- Language: Silent film

La maison ensorcelée (literally "The Ensorcelled House" from French, English: The House of Ghosts, also known as The Witch House) is a 1907 French trick film directed by Segundo de Chomón. The film features stop-motion animation and is considered one of the earliest cinematic depictions of a haunted house premise.

== Plot ==
Two men and a woman stop at a small house in the woods. Inside, they experience numerous instances of paranormal activity, including disappearing furniture; a stereotypical ghost; movement of cutlery and food on their own; ball lightning; unexplained tilting of the entire home; and a grotesque being with claw-like fingers that attempts to eat the trio.

== Legacy ==
The film inspired director Jennifer Kent, and was included in a scene in her 2014 horror film The Babadook.
