= Puppet designer =

A puppet designer / puppet maker is a person who designs and creates puppets for themselves or for other ventriloquists and puppeteers. Puppetry predates written history in many cultures, and seems to have evolved from the mask.

In Europe the art of puppetry is alive and well-respected and often nationally funded as it is part of national identity, similar to opera and ballet with which puppetry has crossed-over many times. As essentially a form of sculpture, puppet design has not suffered the fate of many nearly extinct crafts, however there are fewer puppet designers than puppeteers, especially as many puppets are mass-produced and sold in stores. However, there are a few modern day workshops who solely specialise in puppet design, for instance in London, Puppets Magic Studio operates a workshop dedicated to producing hand made puppets.

In the United States, puppetry is primarily perceived as children's entertainment, though a few puppet designers have made the art form accessible to adult audiences. Popular American puppet designers include Bill Baird, Jim Henson, and Julie Taymor.

Stan Winston of Stan Winston Studios considers many of his character creations to be puppets and for motion pictures his operating crews join the Screen Actors Guild because they are essentially performing directly through an inanimate, if sometimes robotic object. As they are operated directly by people and not pre-programmed, Stan Winston creations can be considered puppets rather than robots.

== In popular culture ==
Fictional puppet designers include Mister Geppetto in The Adventures of Pinocchio, and Gein in Rurouni Kenshin.
