= El heredero de Casa Pruna =

- Directed by: Segundo de Chomón
- Written by: Segundo de Chomón
- Produced by: Macaya y Marro
- Cinematography: Segundo de Chomón
- Release date: 1904 (Spain)
- Running time: 6 minutes 14 seconds
- Country: Spain
- Language: Spanish

El heredero de Casa Pruna (English: The Heir of the Pruna House, Catalan: L’hereu de Can Pruna) is a Spanish short silent film directed by Segundo de Chomón. It was shot in Barcelona in 1904 and released in Spain the same year, making it the first Spanish comedy film.

== Plot ==
El heredero de Casa Pruna (1904)

In a small village, a young man dressed in a grotesque fashion asks a scrivener to write for him the following notice: "The heir of the Pruna house would like to get married. You can meet him at the Chicha-Chic farm in Horta. He shall have a laurel branch at his buttonhole". The notice is posted on the wall and soon a group of women gather to read it. The young man waits with a very large branch of laurel in front of his house and soon a large crowd of women assembles. He runs away chased by the women, gets out of the property through a big gate, climbs over a wall, falls down a steep slope, steals a man's bicycle and rides away only to fall down very soon, continues running down a lane and through an orchard, before arriving at a fountain. All along the women run behind him. The last seconds of the film are missing but it is likely that he would fall into the water.

== Production and analysis ==
The film was inspired by several films based on a similar plot which were produced in the US during 1904: Personal, directed by Wallace McCutcheon Sr., How a French Nobleman Got a Wife Through the New York Herald Personal Columns directed by Edwin S. Porter, and Meet Me at the Fountain, directed by Sigmund Lubin. De Chomón transposed the action to Spain and filmed it on various locations around Horta, which has now become a district of Barcelona.

El heredero de Casa Pruna: medium shot

The film is composed of 13 shots, one of them being interrupted by a close-up of the notice written by the scrivener. Each of the shots shows a different outdoor location. All the shots are wide shots except one medium shot of the main protagonist. The chase is filmed from three different angles: 1) the camera facing the runners, 2) at a 45° angle, 3) laterally, in that case the camera briefly pans to follow the action, a camera movement quite innovative for the time.

== Preservation ==
The film was considered lost until 2002 when a nitrate copy was found, with only the last seconds missing, in the archives of the Cinema Museum of Girona.
