= The Enchanted Toymaker =

1904 film by Arthur Melbourne-Cooper

The Enchanted Toymaker (also known as The Fairy Godmother and Toy Maker and Good Fairy) is a 1904 British short film, directed and animated by Arthur Melbourne-Cooper. Its running time was 3 minutes and 10 seconds. It combined live-action and stop-motion animation.

The film was produced for the Alpha Trading Company. It was filmed at Studio Bedford Park, Beaconsfield Road, St Albans. The anonymous toymaker is thought to have been played by the actor Samuel Chote. The fairy was played by the actress Hattie Makins.

== Plot ==
An aging toymaker dreams about a good fairy, who brings his toys to life. The toy animals enter a version of Noah's Ark.

== Impact ==
The film may have contained "true animation". Along with Melbourne-Cooper's Dolly's Toys (1901), they are thought to have inspired the American director and animation pioneer J. Stuart Blackton. Both of the films by Melbourne-Cooper were duped and distributed by Thomas Edison. Under the title The Toy Maker and the Good Fairy, the film appeared in a catalogue dated to September, 1904. Edison did not attempt to copyright the film under his own name. By this period, the Edison film catalogue included films originally distributed by either Robert W. Paul or Pathé.

Melbourne-Cooper used the theme of living toys in several of his films. Edwin S. Porter, a special effects pioneer working for Edison, is thought to have produced "imitations" of these films. In turn, Blackton patterned his early films on either Melbourne-Cooper's films or on their remakes by Porter. Both the British and the American versions of these tales of living toys are now thought to be lost films.

== General references ==
- Crafton, Donald (2014), "Cinema Chez Gaumont", Emile Cohl, Caricature, and Film, Princeton University Press, ISBN 978-1400860715
- de Vries, Tjitte; Mul, Ati (2009), "28 Animation Pictures and Two Inserts", "They Thought it was a Marvel": Arthur Melbourne-Cooper (1874-1961) : Pioneer of Puppet Animation, Amsterdam University Press, ISBN 978-9085550167
