= Pathécolor =

Early filmmaking technique

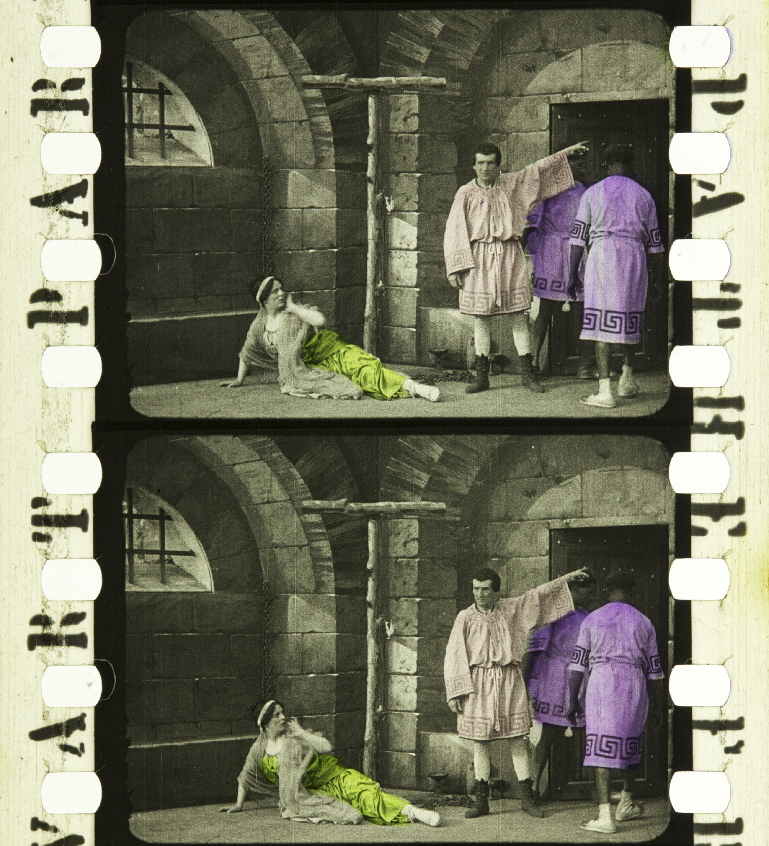
Pathécolor tinting on a print of Amour d'esclave (1907)

Pathécolor, later renamed Pathéchrome, was an early mechanical stencil-based film tinting process for movies developed by Segundo de Chomón for Pathé in the early 20th century. Among the last feature films to use this process was Elstree Calling (1930), a British revue film.

However, the stencil process was not a color photography process and did not use color film stock. Like computer-based film colorization processes, it was a way of arbitrarily adding selected colors to films originally photographed and printed in black-and-white.

Each frame of an extra print of the black-and-white film to be colored was rear-projected onto a sheet of frosted glass, as in rotoscoping. An operator used a blunt stylus to trace the outlines of areas of the projected image that were to be tinted one particular color. The stylus was connected to a reducing pantograph that caused a sharp blade to cut corresponding outlines through the actual film frame, creating the stencil for that color in that frame. This had to be done for each individual frame, and as many different stencil films had to be made as there were different colors to be added. Each of the final projection prints was matched up with one of the stencil films and run through a machine that applied the corresponding dye through the stencil. This operation was repeated using each of the different stencils and dyes in turn.

The Pathécolor stencil process should not be confused with the later Pathécolor, Pathé Color and Color by Pathé (sometimes without the acute accent) trade names seen in screen credits and advertising materials. Like Metrocolor, WarnerColor and Color by DeLuxe, these were simply rebrandings of Eastman Kodak's Eastmancolor color negative film.

== See also ==
- List of early color feature films
- List of color film systems
- List of film formats
