= Hôtel électrique =

- Directed by: Segundo de Chomón
- Produced by: Pathé Frères
- Starring: Segundo de Chomón, Julienne Mathieu
- Distributed by: Pathé Frères
- Release date: 31 October 1908
- Running time: 8 minutes
- Country: France
- Language: Silent

Hôtel électrique (also released in Spanish as El hotel eléctrico; transl. The Electric Hotel) is a 1908 silent French comedy-fantasy trick film directed by Segundo de Chomón and produced by Pathé Frères. The short appears to be inspired by the 1907 American short film The Haunted Hotel.

== Plot ==
Laure and Bertrand arrive at the Electric Hotel, where a control board allows inanimate objects to come to life. For most of the film, the effects are used to perform tasks such as polishing shoes, styling hair and putting away luggage, to the two guests' great pleasure. At the end, a drunken concierge erratically throws switches that cause the system to go haywire, sending all of the hotel's furniture into a jumbled, chaotic mess.

== Background ==
The film displays one of the earliest uses of stop motion animation in history, though it is not de Chomón's first try at this technique: his 1906 film, Le théâtre de Bob, uses animated puppets. However, Hôtel électrique is also an early use of pixilation.

Julienne Mathieu's hair appears to brush itself, one of the first uses of stop-motion animation in film.

== Cast ==
- Segundo de Chomón as Bertrand
- Julienne Mathieu as Laure
