= Julienne Mathieu =

French actress (1874–1943)

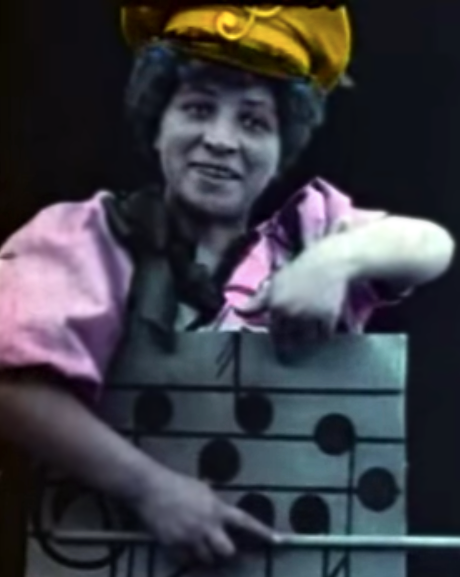
- Julienne Mathieu, star of the Pathé Productions, in En avant la musique (Music Forward!), silent film of 1907
- Born: Julienne Alexandrine Mathieu; September 21, 1874; Saint-Sauveur-en-Puisaye, France
- Died: December 1, 1943 (aged 69); Chieri, Kingdom of Italy
- Resting place: Ospizio della Carità, Chieri, Italy
- Other names: Suzanne (informal or later name)
- Occupations: Actress, special effects expert
- Years active: 1905–1909
- Notable work: Hôtel électrique
- Spouse: Segundo de Chomón
- Children: Robert de Chomón
- Relatives: France Mathieu (sister)

Julienne Alexandrine Mathieu (September 21, 1874 – December 1, 1943) was one of the earliest French silent film actresses who appeared mostly in French silents between 1905 and 1909. She appeared in the silent film Hôtel électrique released in 1908, one of the first films to incorporate stop motion animation. She was the wife of the director Segundo de Chomón. Her contribution to his work was not only her participation in the cast, but also in the script and the special effects (in particular, Pathécolor process to which she introduced her husband).

== Biography ==
From 1907 to 1909, she was credited in the cast of at least 42 films. Most of them were shot by Segundo de Chomón, but she also appeared in films of Gaston Velle, Albert Capellani, Ferdinand Zecca and Lucien Nonguet. Many of these productions are marked by the use of special effects, of which her husband and she have become specialists, such as stop-motion animation, pixilation, overprinting, dissolving, even tracking shot. For their inspiration, they closely imitated the production of Méliès, who was arguably less successful; by funding the Mathieu-Chomón couple, Pathé Frères Productions sought to regain the advantage over its competitor, Star Film.

Her life on screen ends in 1909. Her sister, France Mathieu, appeared then in her place, and disappeared soon from the picture too. From 1912 to 1925, Julienne Mathieu seems to have lived in Turin (Italy) with her family, sometimes called Suzanne. She died in oblivion at the Hospice of Charity (Ospizio della Carità) in Chieri (Italy) on December 1, 1943, while the city was still under German occupation after the fall of Fascist Italy.

== Analysis ==
Julienne Mathieu's hair appears to brush itself in Hôtel électrique, one of the first uses of stop-motion animation in film.

Principal character of movies where magic was central, Julienne Mathieu was almost always presented as the master of ceremonies, unlike other productions of her time, by Méliès or Blackton for example, which faced the same diegesis. In En avant la musique (1907), a film parodying Méliès' Le mélomane (1903), for example, she was playing a female bandmaster who stole the heads of her male musicians to throw them on a giant musical sheet.

The rehabilitation of Julienne Mathieu is pending, according to the organizers of a conference in 2018: "Figures that have remained in the shadows are emerging, like Julienne Mathieu, who could be qualified as co-author on each of her films." For others, she was an excellent connoisseur of the entertainment industry and of cinematographic techniques, and she was at least an "artistic collaborator".

== Filmography ==
1909

- 1909. Le Roi des aulnes, by Segundo de Chomón
- 1909. Le jeu de patience, by Segundo de Chomón
- 1909. Voyage dans la Lune (Nouveau voyage à la Lune), by Segundo de Chomón
- 1909. La leçon de musique, by Segundo de Chomón (4 min, color, silent, 1.33)

1908

- 1908. Le voyage original (A New Way of Traveling), by Segundo de Chomón
- 1908. Le voleur mystérieux, by Segundo de Chomón
- 1908. Sculpture moderne (ou Sculpteur moderne, ou Sculpteurs modernes), by Segundo de Chomón (4 min, stencil), produit par Pathé-Frères
- 1908. Magie moderne, by Segundo de Chomón (3 min, stencil, format 1.33, prod.: Pathé-Frères)
- 1908. Le chevalier mystère (ou Chevalier mystère), by Segundo de Chomón (color, silent, prod.: Pathé-Frères), with André Deed
- 1908. Chiffonniers et caricaturistes (Chiffonniers caricaturistes, Chiffonniers et caricatures), by Segundo de Chomón
- 1908. La légende du fantôme, by Segundo de Chomón (13 min 30 s, silent, prod.: Pathé-Frères)
- 1908. La Belle au bois dormant, by Lucien Nonguet or Albert Capellani (11 min 16 s)
- 1908. Hôtel électrique, by Segundo de Chomón (9 min 31 s, silent, prod.: Pathé-Frères)
- 1908. Les cocottes en papier, by Segundo de Chomón (5 min 40 s, silent, prod.: Pathé-Frères)
- 1908. Les teintes chinoises
- 1908. Les têtes fantastiques, by Segundo de Chomón
- 1908. Les dés magiques, by Segundo de Chomón (7 min, silent, prod.: Pathé-Frères)
- 1908. Le miroir magique, by Segundo de Chomón (2 min, silent, prod.: Pathé-Frères)
- 1908. Cauchemar et doux rêve, by Segundo de Chomón (4 min 45 s, silent, prod.: Pathé-Frères)
- 1908. Les incompréhensibles, by Segundo de Chomón
- 1908. Les joies du mariage, by Segundo de Chomón
- 1908. Les ombres chinoises (Sombras chinescas), by Segundo de Chomón (3 min, silent, prod.: Pathé-Frères)
- 1908. La belle et la bête, by Albert Capellani (11 min, silent, prod.: Pathé-Frères)

1907

- 1907. Les œufs de Pâques, by Segundo de Chomón
- 1907. La fée des roches noires, by Segundo de Chomón (3 min, silent, prod.: Pathé-Frères)
- 1907. Le spectre rouge, by Segundo de Chomón et Ferdinand Zecca (9 min, stencil, format 1.33, prod.: Pathé-Frères)
- 1907. Les chrysanthèmes, by Segundo de Chomón
- 1907. La grenouille, by Segundo de Chomón (3 min, prod.: Pathé-Frères)
- 1907. Le rêve de Toula, by Segundo de Chomón
- 1907. Le sculpteur express (Sculpture express), by Segundo de Chomón
- 1907. Satan s'amuse, by Segundo de Chomón (9 min)
- 1907. En avant la musique, by Segundo de Chomón (1 min 51 s, sonore)
- 1907. Armures mystérieuses (L'armure mystérieuse), by Segundo de Chomón
- 1907. Vie et passion de Notre Seigneur Jésus Christ, by Lucien Nonguet or Ferdinand Zecca (43 min, prod.: Pathé-Frères) – role of the Virgin Mary
- 1907. Les verres enchantés (The Enchanted Glasses), by Segundo de Chomón (3 min, silent, prod.: Pathé-Frères)
- 1907. Les glaces merveilleuses, by Segundo de Chomón (7 min, silent, prod.: Pathé-Frères)
- 1907. L'étang enchanté, by Segundo de Chomón (1 min 30 s, silent, prod.: Pathé-Frères)

1906

- 1906. La dernière sorcière, by Segundo de Chomón

1905

- 1905. La poule aux œufs d'or, by Gaston Velle or Albert Capellani (16 min)
- 1905. L'antre infernal, by Gaston Velle
