= Segundo de Chomón =

Spanish film director, cinematographer, screenwriter and animator

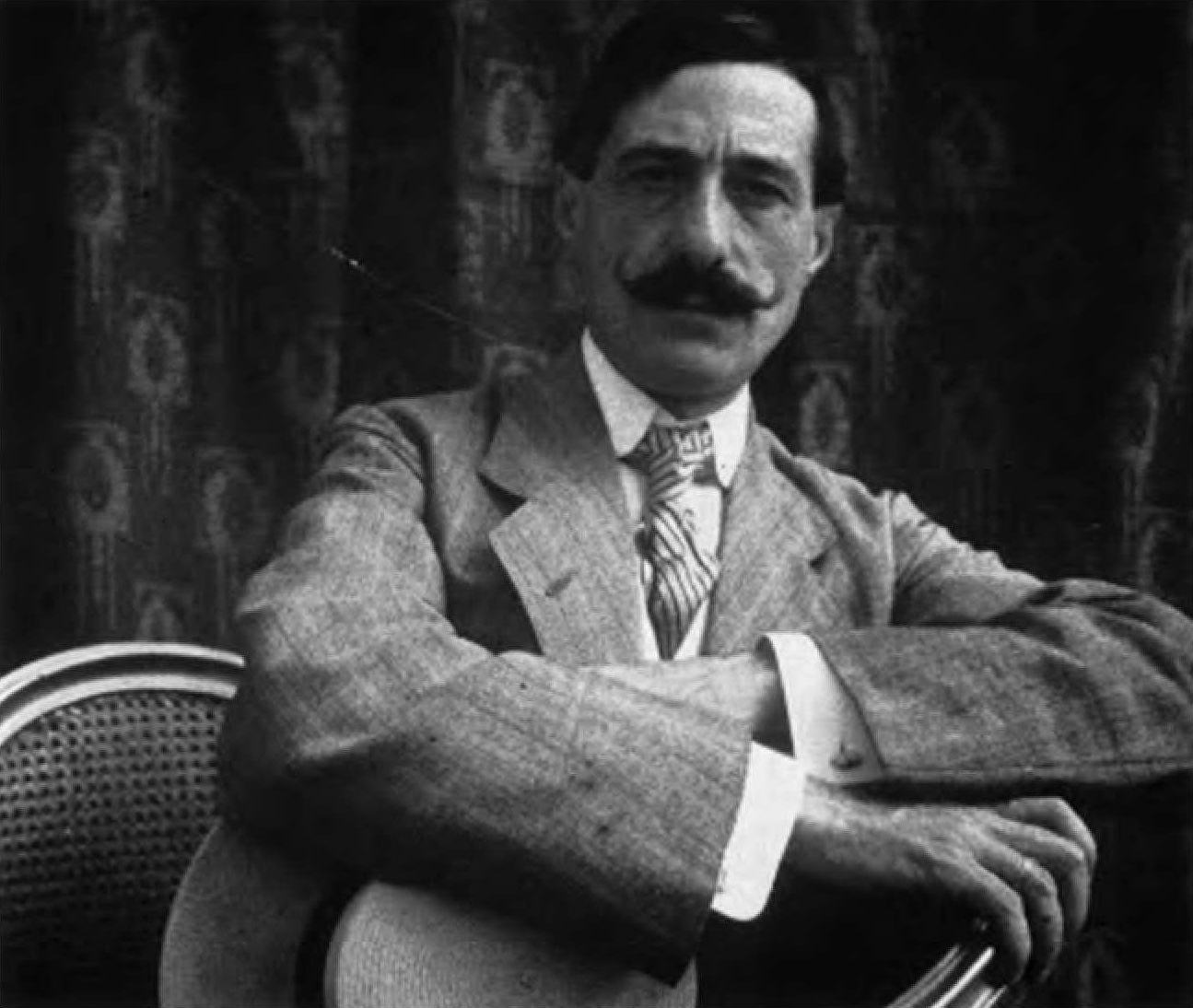
- de Chomón in the 1910s.
- Born: Segundo Víctor Aurelio Chomón y Ruiz; 17 October 1871; Teruel, Spain
- Died: 2 May 1929 (aged 57); Paris, France
- Years active: 1900–1927
- Spouse: Julienne Mathieu

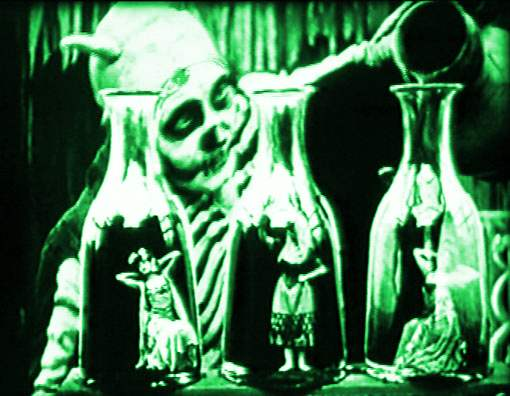
Satán se divierte (1907)

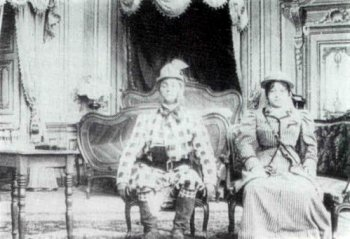
Hôtel électrique (1908)

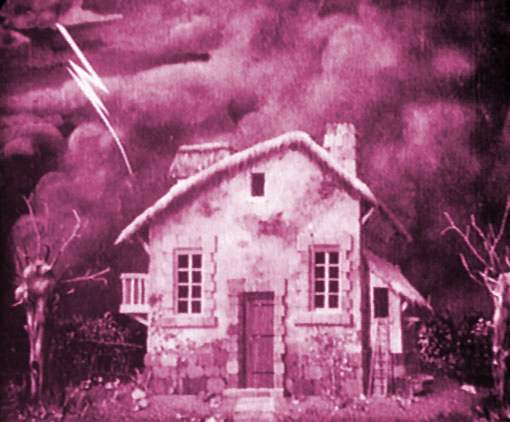
La maison ensorcelée (1908)

Loie Fuller dancing at Folies Bergere 1902.

Segundo Víctor Aurelio Chomón y Ruiz (also Chomont or Chaumont, French: [ʃomɔ̃]; 17 October 1871 – 2 May 1929) was a pioneering Spanish-French film director, cinematographer and screenwriter. He produced many short films in France while working for Pathé Frères and has been compared to Georges Méliès, due to his frequent camera tricks and optical illusions. He is regarded as the most significant Spanish silent film director in an international context.

== Biography ==
Born in Aragon (Spain), Segundo de Chomón reportedly got into film through the efforts of his French actress wife, Julienne Mathieu, who appeared in early Pathé Frères productions and worked in some special effects Parisian workshops like Thuillier's studio. Around 1900 he became an agent for Pathé Frères in Spain, publicizing and distributing their films out of Barcelona. In 1901, Chomón began producing actuality films in Spain on an independent basis and distributing them through Pathé; his first trick film was Gulliver en el país de los gigantes (1903). Chomón and his wife also specialized in producing stencil colored film prints and were one of the developers of the Pathéchrome process, patented by Pathé in 1905. Charles Pathé noted the quality of Chomón's trick films and, from 1903, began to support these efforts with the desire of competing with Georges Méliès.

Chomón was expert enough at making trick films and had proven himself so valuable to Pathé that in 1905 he and Mathieu moved from Barcelona to Paris, and Chomón was placed in charge of a color stencilling shop in addition to his periodic duties as a director. Through 1907, Chomón worked in close collaboration with Pathé's top director, Ferdinand Zecca; the partnership worked so well that in 1907 Zecca selected Chomón to co-direct a major project, the remake of Zecca's own 1903 Vie et Passion de Notre Seigneur Jésus Christ. Shortly afterward, Zecca moved into an executive position at Pathé and did little direction from that time; Chomón's most productive years as a filmmaker lasted from 1907 to 1912, a period during which Méliès' production went into a steep decline. Chomón often worked with other directors; in addition to Zecca he collaborated with Gaston Velle, Juan Fuster, Alberto Capellani and Émile Cohl. Although he remained with Pathé, in 1910 Chomón returned to Barcelona and started an independent production company, Iberico Films, which proved short-lived.

In 1912, Chómon accepted an invitation to make films in Italy. In addition to his own films, he worked on special effects on the films of others, notably Giovanni Pastrone's epic Cabiria (1914). Pastrone returned the favor in 1917 through collaborating on Chomón's last directorial effort, La guerra e il sogno di Momi; Chomón's own films had become less frequent after his move to Italy, and he had primarily worked in visual effects and cinematography in these years. After 1917, Chomón principally worked on creating visual effects for the films of others, including Guido Brignone's Maciste in Hell (1925) and Abel Gance's Napoléon (1927). Towards the end of his life, Chomón collaborated with Swiss inventor Ernest Zollinger (ex-Pathé, ex-Itala Films) to develop a photographic, two-color film process. Chomón was planning to get back into full-time film production on his own when he died, suddenly, of a heart attack at age 57.

== Legacy ==
The very year that Chomón died, the Surrealists organized a soirée that would rehabilitate the artistic reputation of Georges Méliès and to begin the long process of recovering his films. Chomón was effectively forgotten in the wake of his death, though over time silent film collectors began to recognize some of his shorts and he was dubbed "The Spanish Méliès" in English-speaking lands. Two of his films, Le spectre rouge (1907) and Hôtel électrique (1908), persistently circulated in the collector's market and were also circulated by the Museum of Modern Art film library; the first as an example of stencilled color and the second as a Pathé Frères film by an unknown director. The Italian film Cabiria (where he was director of photography & special FX) featured what may have been the first "dolly shot" in the movies, utilizing a device built by Chomón. Finally, recognition came to Chomón in his home country, as the Filmoteca de Catalunya established a special division with the purpose of collecting and cataloguing what was left of his output; a DVD collection in PAL format with 31 films, Segundo Chomón: Le Cine de la Fantasia, was released by the Filmoteca in 2010. Many of de Chomon's Parisian Pathé Frères films have been recovered, but his Spanish and Italian productions have proven more elusive.

Comparisons of Chomón's work with that of Georges Méliès is inevitable, with those in Chomón's court insisting that he was a better filmmaker, whereas those on Méliès' side insist that Chomón was a mere imitator. While it is hard to top Méliès' achievements in discovering basic editing and in his eye-popping production designs, Chomon was a slightly more modern filmmaker than Méliès. Chomón relied extensively on animation, a field in which he was a pioneer and a technique Georges Méliès seldom, if ever, used. Moreover, Chomón offered slight improvements on some techniques that Méliès already had tried, such as in Les Kiriki, acrobates japonais (1907). Chomón's work was also more expansive in terms of genre than that of Méliès; he started in actuality films and continued working in this field after the transition to documentary and was also employed on standard dramatic features as well. Méliès began making actualities also, in 1896, but after discovering and developing the trick film and fantasy genres, he stayed put. Nevertheless, it is for his trick films that Chomón will be best remembered; Spain honored him with a postage stamp in 1994. Chomón's film Armures Mystérieuses (The Mysterious Armor or The Wonderful Armor) was preserved by the Academy Film Archive in 2010.

Film historian Tom Gunning has suggested that Luis Buñuel and/or Salvador Dalí were familiar with Chomón's Superstition andalouse (1912) years before making their experimental film Un Chien andalou in 1929.

== Filmography ==
- 1901: Bajada de Montserrat
- 1902: Choque de trenes
- 1902: Danse des Ouléd-Naïd
- 1902: Loie Fuller
- 1902: Montserrat
- 1903: Gulliver en el país de los Gigantes
- 1903: Los héroes del sitio de Zaragoza
- 1903: Pulgarcito
- 1904: Barcelone, Le parc au crépuscule
- 1904: El heredero de Casa Pruna
- 1905: Verres enchanté (The Enchanted Glasses)
- 1906: Ah! La barbe
- 1906: Hallucination musicale
- 1906: L'antre de la sorcière
- 1906: L'homme aux trente-six têtes
- 1906: L'obsession du billard
- 1906: La dernière sorcière
- 1906: La fée aux pigeons
- 1906: La maison ensorcelée
- 1906: Le courant électrique
- 1906: Le mariage du roi Alphonse XIII
- 1906: Le roi des dollars
- 1906: Le sorcier arabe
- 1906: Le théâtre de Bob
- 1906: Le troubadour
- 1906: Les cent trucs
- 1906: Les roses magiques
- 1906: L’obsession de l’or
- 1906: Plongeur fantastique
- 1907: Ali Baba et les quarante voleurs
- 1907: Armures mystérieuses
- 1907: En avant la musique
- 1907: Fantaisies endiablées
- 1907: L'étang enchanté
- 1907: La boîte à cigares
- 1907: La forge infernale
- 1907: La fée des roches noires
- 1907: La Passion de Jésus
- 1907: Le bailleur
- 1907: Le baiser de la sorcière
- 1907: Le charmeur
- 1907: Le parapluie fantastique
- 1907: Le scarabée d'or
- 1907: Le scarabée d'or
- 1907: Le sculpteur express
- 1907: Le spectre rouge
- 1907: Les chrysanthèmes
- 1907: Les flammes diaboliques
- 1907: Les glaces merveilleuses
- 1907: Les Kiriki, acrobates japonais
- 1907: Les tulipes
- 1907: Les verres enchantés
- 1907: Les œufs de Pâques
- 1907: Métempsycose
- 1907: Métempsycose
- 1907: Satan s'amuse
- 1907: Silhouettes animées
- 1908: Chiffonniers et caricaturistes
- 1908: Création de la serpentine
- 1908: Cuisine magnétique
- 1908: Déménagement magnétique
- 1908: Hôtel électrique
- 1908: Voyage dans la lune
- 1908: Hôtel électrique
- 1908: L'abeille et la rose
- 1908: L'araignée d'or
- 1908: L'aspirateur
- 1908: L'auberge tranquille
- 1908: L'insaisissable pickpocket
- 1908: L'écran magique
- 1908: La grenouille
- 1908: La grotte des esprits
- 1908: La légende du fantôme
- 1908: La table magique
- 1908: Le chevalier mystère
- 1908: Le rêve de Toula
- 1908: Le rêve des marmitons
- 1908: Le secret de la sorcière
- 1908: Le voleur mystérieux
- 1908: Les affiches animées
- 1908: Les flammes mystérieuses
- 1908: Les grotesques
- 1908: Les jouets vivants
- 1908: Les lunatiques
- 1908: Les ombres chinoises
- 1908: Les pantins de Misole
- 1908: Les papillons japonais
- 1908: Les tribulations du roi Tétaclaque
- 1908: Les œufs merveilleux
- 1908: Magie moderne
- 1908: Mes fleurs
- 1908: Sculpteur moderne
- 1908: Voyage oriental
- 1908: Voyage original
- 1909: Cauchemar et doux rêves
- 1909: Farce macabre
- 1909: L'âne de la sorcière
- 1909: La forge du diable
- 1909: La leçon de musique
- 1909: La liquéfaction des corps
- 1909: Le jeu de patience
- 1909: Le petit Poucet
- 1909: Le Roi des aulnes
- 1909: Le voleur invisible
- 1909: Les cadeaux de la fée
- 1909: Les cocottes en papier
- 1909: Les guirlandes merveilleuses
- 1909: Les têtes fantastiques
- 1909: Mars
- 1909: Pickpock ne craint pas les entraves
- 1909: Symphonie bizarre
- 1909: Une excursion incohérente
- 1909: Voyage au centre de la Terre
- 1909: Voyage sur la planète Jupiter
- 1910: Amor Gitano
- 1910: El ejemplo
- 1910: El pobre Valbuena
- 1910: El puente de la muerte
- 1910: El puñao de rosas
- 1910: Flema inglesa
- 1910: Flores y perlas
- 1910: Gerona: la Venecia española
- 1910: Justicias del rey don Pedro
- 1910: La expiación
- 1910: La fatalidad
- 1910: La fecha de Pepín
- 1910: La gratitud de las flores
- 1910: La heroica Zaragoza.
- 1910: La hija del guardacostas
- 1910: La manta del caballo
- 1910: La tempranica
- 1910: Las carceleras
- 1910: Los dulces de Arturo
- 1910: Los guapos
- 1910: Los pobres de levita
- 1910: Lucha fratricida o Nobleza Aragonesa
- 1910: Pragmática real
- 1910: Una farsa de Colás
- 1910: Venganza de un carbonero
- 1911: Pulgarcito
- 1912: El talismán del vagabundo
- 1912: Métamorphoses
- 1912: Soñar despierto
- 1916: La guerra e il sogno di Momi, directed with Giovanni Pastrone
