= Cinema of Spain =

- No. of screens: 3,609 (2023)
- Main distributors: Universal (25.2%); Disney (21.1%); Warner (19.5%); Sony (10.3%); Paramount (5.6%); A Contracorriente (2.6%); Diamond Films (2.5%); Vértice (2.0%); DeAPlaneta (1.3%); Filmax (0.8%)

Produced feature films (2023)
- Total: 375
- Fictional: 173 (46.1%)
- Animated: 7 (0.2%)
- Documentary: 176 (46.9%)

Number of admissions (2023)
- Total: 77,827,557
- National films: 13,446,247

Gross box office (2023)
- Total: €500 million
- National films: €82.4 million (16.5%)

The cinema of Spain, or Spanish cinema, comprises the film industry and its film productions, whether made within Spain or by Spanish film production companies abroad. The most important spanish directors are Luis Buñuel, Carlos Saura and Pedro Almodóvar.

Only a portion of box office sales in Spain are generated by domestic films. The different Spanish governments have therefore implemented measures aimed at supporting local film production and the movie theaters, which currently include the assurance of funding from the main television broadcasters. Nowadays, the Institute of Cinematography and Audiovisual Arts (ICAA) is the State agency in charge of regulating the allocation of public funds to the domestic film industry.

== History ==
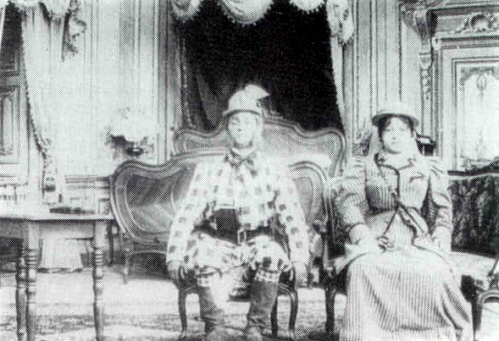
Excerpt from El hotel eléctrico (Segundo de Chomón, 1908).

The first film exhibition in Spain took place on 5 May 1895, in Barcelona. Exhibitions of Lumière films were screened in Madrid, Málaga, and Barcelona in May and December 1896, respectively.

The matter of which Spanish film came first is in dispute. The first was either Salida de la misa de doce de la Iglesia del Pilar de Zaragoza–Exit of the Twelve O'Clock Mass from the Church of El Pilar of Zaragoza–(Eduardo Jimeno Peromarta), Plaza del puerto en Barcelona–Plaza of the Port of Barcelona–(Alexandre Promio) or Llegada de un tren de Teruel a Segorbe–Arrival of a Train from Teruel in Segorbe–(anonymous); all released in 1897. The first Spanish film with a plot is Riña en un café (Fructuós Gelabert, 1899).

The first Spanish film director to achieve great success internationally was Segundo de Chomón, who worked in France and Italy but made several famous fantasy films in Spain, such as El hotel eléctrico (1908).

=== Silent Era ===
In 1914, Barcelona was the center of the country's film industry. The españoladas (historical Spanish epics) predominated until the 1960s. Prominent among these were the films by Florián Rey, starring Imperio Argentina, and the first version of Nobleza Baturra (Juan Vila Vilamala, 1925). Historical dramas such as Vida de Cristóbal Colón y su Descubrimiento de América (Gérard Bourgeois, 1917), adaptations of newspaper serials such as Los misterios de Barcelona (starring Joan Maria Codina, 1916), and of stage plays such as Don Juan Tenorio (Ricardo de Baños, 1922) and zarzuelas, were also produced. Even the Nobel Prize-winning playwright Jacinto Benavente, who said that "in film they pay me the scraps," would shoot film versions of his theatrical works.

In 1928, Ernesto Giménez Caballero and Luis Buñuel founded the first cine-club, in Madrid. By that point, Madrid was already the primary center of the industry; forty-four of the fifty-eight films released up until that point had been produced there.

The rural drama The Cursed Village (Florian Rey, 1930) was a hit in Paris, where, at the same time, Buñuel and Salvador Dalí premiered Un chien andalou. Un chien andalou has become one of the most well-known avant-garde films of that era.

=== Transition to sound ===
By 1931, the introduction of foreign sound films had hurt the Spanish film industry to the point where only a single title was released that year.

In 1932, Manuel Casanova founded the Compañía Industrial Film Española S.A. (Cifesa) and introduced sound to Spanish film-making. Cifesa would grow to become the biggest production company to ever exist in Spain. Sometimes criticized as an instrument of the right wing, it nevertheless supported young filmmakers such as Buñuel and his pseudo-documentary Las Hurdes: Tierra Sin Pan (1933). In 1933 it was responsible for filming seventeen motion pictures and in 1934, twenty-one. The most notable success was Paloma Fair (Benito Perojo, 1935). They were also responsible for Don Quijote de la Mancha (Rafael Gil, 1947), the most elaborate version of the Cervantes classic up to that time. By 1935 production had risen to thirty-seven films.

=== Civil War and Francoist Spain ===
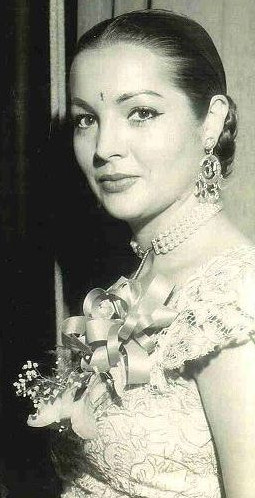
Actress Sara Montiel circa 1955

The Civil War devastated the silent film era: only ten per cent of all silent films made before 1936 survived the war. Films were also destroyed for their celluloid content and made into goods.

Around 1936, both sides of the Civil War began to use cinema as a means of propaganda. A typical example of this is España 1936 (Buñuel, 1937), which also contains much rare newsreel footage. The pro-Franco side founded the National Department of Cinematography, causing many actors to go into exile.

The new regime then began to impose censorship and the obligatory dubbing to Spanish of all films released. Highlights in this era are El difunto es un vivo (Ignacio F. Iquino, 1941), Traces of Light (Rafael Gil, 1941), Madness for Love (Juan de Orduña, 1948), Last Stand in the Philippines (Antonio Román, 1945), Raza (José Luis Sáenz de Heredia with screenplay by Franco himself, 1942), and The Tower of the Seven Hunchbacks (Edgar Neville, 1944). Cifesa produced Ella, él y sus millones (de Orduña, 1944) as well as Fedra (Manuel Mur Oti, 1956).

A policy of autarky tried to keep foreign currency in the country and establish a domestic film industry. If the distributors wanted licences to import and dub foreign films (audiences preferred American films), they would have to acquire them from producers of local films. The number of licences depended on the merits (artistic, moral, cultural, political) acknowledged by the government to each local film. The American distributors of the MPAA tried to open the market removing the local producers. To that end, they embargoed Spain from May 1951. The embargo continued into 1952 due to complications with American studios outside MPAA and reorganizations within the Spanish government. Spanish producers, lacking the income from the dubbing licences and with an uncertain future, greatly diminished their production as well. An agreement between Spain and the United States was ultimately reached.

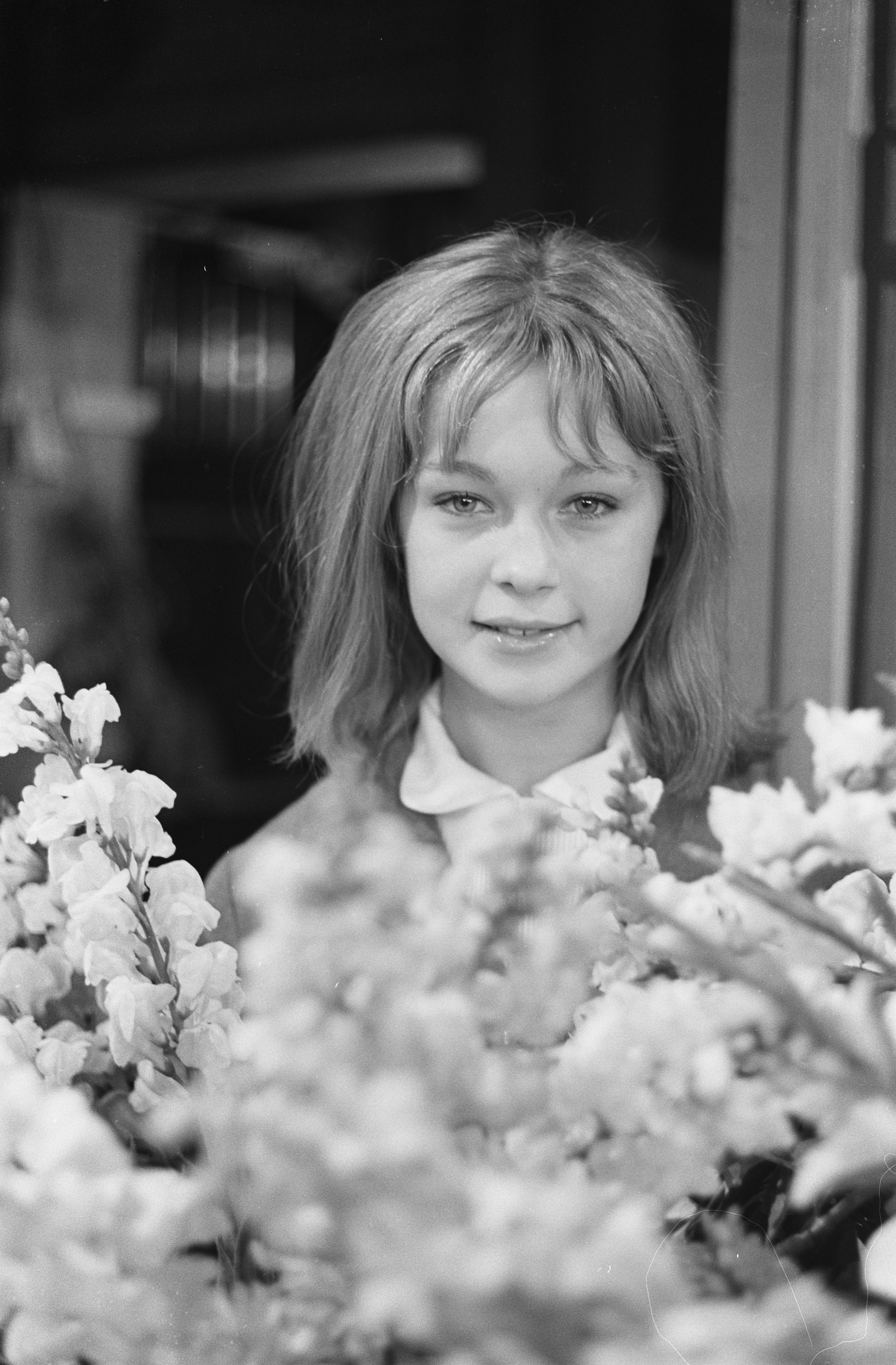
Marisol was a popular wunderkind during Francoism.

On the other hand, Miracle of Marcelino (Ladislao Vajda, 1955) is the first Spanish film to obtain worldwide recognition from critics and audiences, winning the Silver Bear award at the 5th Berlin International Film Festival. This film would trigger a trend of child actors, such as Joselito, Marisol, Rocío Dúrcal or Pili y Mili starring in popular musical films.

In 1951, the regime established the Ministry of Information and Tourism to safeguard and develop the Spanish brand, the social imagery and the public image under the slogan "Spain is different" which was launched in the 1920s and then internationally spread in the 1960s. Its main purpose was to promote the Spanish tourist industry and a massive inflow of people who came from all over Europe to Andalusia, looking for what they saw in the Spanish films: sun and sea, comfortable transports and hotels, good ethnic cuisine, passion and adventure, and the so called españoladas (bulls, castanets, flamenco, Gitano culture and folklore). Fog and Sun (José María Forqué, 1951) was the first movies belonging to the genre of the "touristic cinema". It was followed by Veraneo en España (Miguel Iglesias, 1958) and by Spain Again (Jaime Camino, 1969).

Musical films The Last Torch Song (de Orduña, 1957) and The Violet Seller (Luis César Amadori, 1958), both starring Sara Montiel, were huge international commercial successes, making Montiel the first world-famous film star—and the highest paid—of Spanish cinema.

==== Social criticism ====
In the 1950s, the influence of neorealism became evident in the works of a number of rather young film directors, such as Furrows (José Antonio Nieves Conde, 1951), Reckless (Nieves Conde, 1951), We're All Necessary (Nieves Conde, 1956), Pride (Mur Oti, 1955), Death of a Cyclist (Juan Antonio Bardem, 1955), Calle Mayor (Bardem, 1956), El pisito (Marco Ferreri, 1959), El cochecito (Ferreri, 1960), Welcome Mr. Marshall! (Luis García Berlanga, 1953), or Plácido (García Berlanga, 1961), ranged from melodrama to esperpento or black comedy, but all of them showed a strong social criticism, unexpected under the political censorship of Franco's regime. From the amorality and selfishness of the upper middle class or the ridiculousness and mediocrity of the small town people to the hopelessness of the impoverished working class, every social stratum of the contemporary Spain was shown up.

Luis Buñuel in turn returned to Spain to film the shocking Viridiana (1961) and Tristana (1970).

=== International co-productions ===
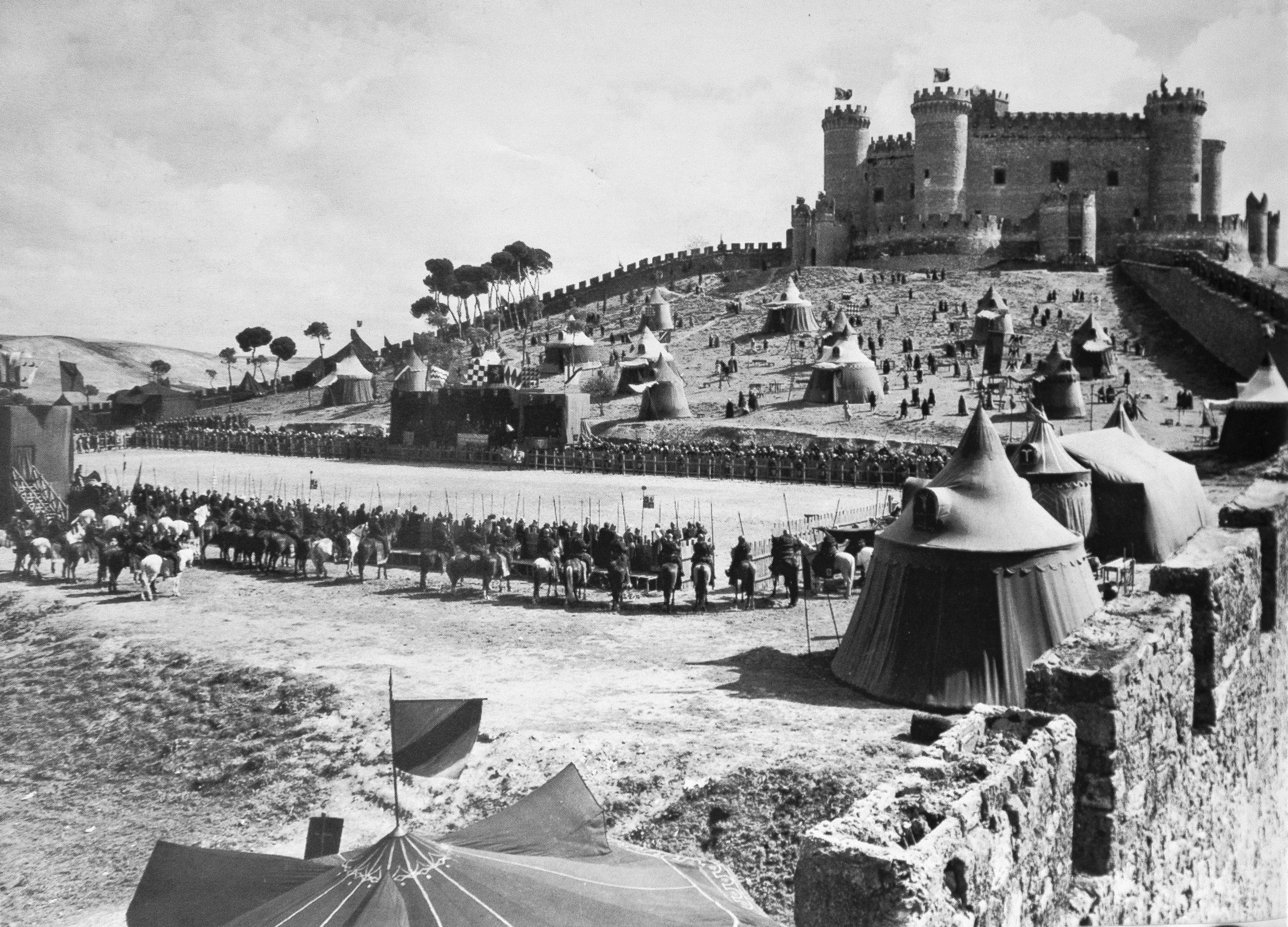
Several international blockbusters were shot in Spain in the 1950s and 1960s. An example is the Italian-American Samuel Bronston-produced epic historical drama El Cid. In the image, shooting of the film in the Castle of Belmonte.

A 1954 report by Eduardo Moya from the Ministry of Trade remarked that the Spanish cinema industry had to become competitive at home and abroad. Co-productions with France and Italy could bring the equipment and skills needed.

Numerous co-productions with France and, most of all, Italy along the 1950s–1970s invigorated Spanish cinema both industrially and artistically. Actually the just mentioned movies by Buñuel were co-productions: Viridiana (1961) was Spanish-Mexican, and Tristana (1970) Spanish-French-Italian. Also, the hundreds of Spaghetti-westerns and sword and sandal films shot in southern Spain by mixed Spanish-Italian teams were co-productions.

Under the Spanish-American agreements, part of the foreign profits locked in Spain since the war were invested in runaway productions to be distributed abroad. Several American epic-scale superproductions or blockbusters were shot in Spain, produced either by Samuel Bronston, such as King of Kings (Nicholas Ray, 1961), El Cid (Anthony Mann, 1961), 55 Days at Peking (Ray, 1963), The Fall of the Roman Empire (Mann, 1964), and Circus World (Henry Hathaway, 1964); or by others, such as Alexander the Great (Robert Rossen, 1956), The Pride and the Passion (Stanley Kramer, 1957), Solomon and Sheba (King Vidor, 1959), Lawrence of Arabia (David Lean, 1962), Doctor Zhivago (Lean, 1965), The Trojan Women (Michael Cacoyannis, 1971). These movies employed many Spanish technical professionals, and as a byproduct caused that some film stars, like Ava Gardner and Orson Welles lived in Spain for years. Actually Welles, with Mr. Arkadin (1955), in fact a French-Spanish-Swiss co-production, was one of the first American filmmakers to choose Spain as location for his shootings, and he did it again for Chimes at Midnight (1966), this time a Spanish-Swiss co-production.

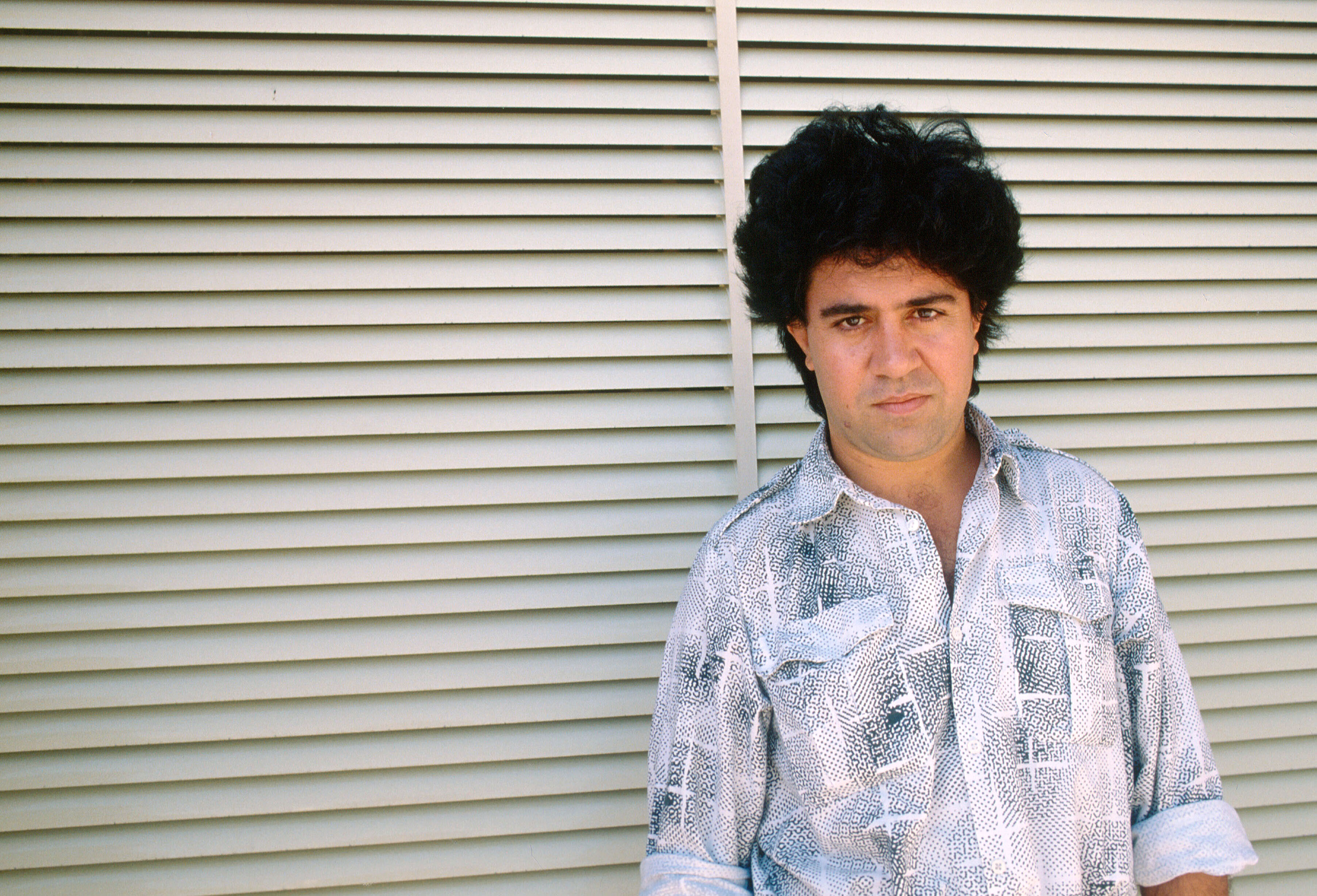
Pedro Almodóvar in 1988.

Warner Bros., an American studio, had opened its local headquarters in Spain in the early 1970s under the name of "Warner Española S.A." Warner Española, alongside releasing Warner Bros. films (as well as films by Disney theatrically in the late 1980s-90s) is also involved in distribution of Spanish films such as Ensalada Baudelaire (1978), Adios Pequeña (1986) and most of 1990s Pedro Almodóvar's films such as High Heels (1991), Kika (1993), and Live Flesh (1997).

Many international actors starred in Spanish films: Italians Vittorio de Sica, Vittorio Gassman and Rossano Brazzi with Mexican María Félix in The Black Crown (Luis Saslavsky, 1951); Italian couple Raf Vallone and Elena Varzi in The Eyes Leave a Trace (Sáenz de Heredia, 1952), Mexican Arturo de Córdova in The Red Fish (Nieves Conde, 1955), Americans Betsy Blair in Calle Mayor (Bardem, 1956); Edmund Gwenn in Calabuch (García Berlanga, 1956), or Richard Basehart in Miracles of Thursday (García Berlanga, 1957) among many others. All the foreign actors were dubbed into Spanish. Mexican actor Gael García Bernal has also recently received international notoriety in films by Spanish directors.

=== New Spanish Cinema ===
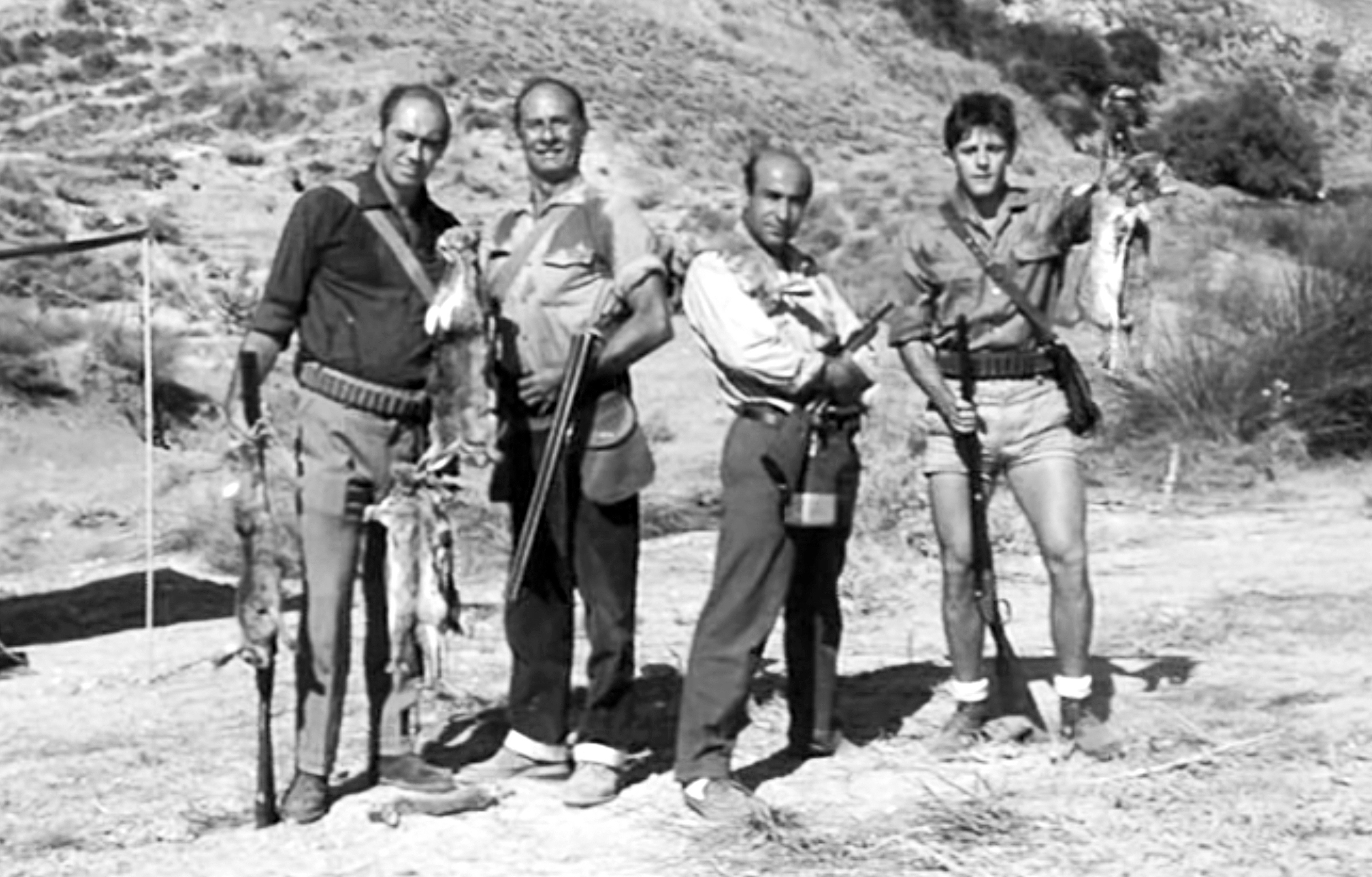
The Hunt (1966) by Carlos Saura. "The Hunt" delves into the consequences of false accusations and mob mentality, emphasizing the vulnerability of innocence.

In 1962, José María García Escudero became the Director General of Cinematography and Theatre, propelling forward state efforts and the Official Cinema School, from which emerged the majority of new directors, generally from the political left and those opposed to the Franco government. Among these were Mario Camus, Miguel Picazo, Francisco Regueiro, Manuel Summers, and, above all, Carlos Saura, who became very famous by his films with his partner Geraldine Chaplin, such as: Peppermint Frappé (1967), Ana and the Wolves(1973) or Cría Cuervos (1976). Apart from this line of directors, Fernando Fernán Gómez made El extraño viaje (1964) and Life Goes On (1965), Víctor Erice The Spirit of the Beehive (1973), and Jaime de Armiñan My Dearest Senorita (1971).

From the so-called Escuela de Barcelona, originally more experimentalist and cosmopolitan, come Jacinto Esteva, Pere Portabella, Joaquin Jordan, Vicente Aranda, Jaime Camino, and Gonzalo Suárez, who made their master works in the 1980s.

In the Basque country the directors Fernando Larruquert, Nestor Basterretxea, José María Zabalza and the producer Elías Querejeta stood out.

The 1968–1980 period saw the golden age of Spanish B-Movie horror, underpinning the term fantaterror to convey the set of films blending supernatural and horror themes that originated as an answer to European and American exploitation titles.

In the 1960s (and 1970s), a new sort of españolada different from the previous one brought the formulation of an "Iberian" model of masculininity associated to casticismo, represented by a male star system consisting of the likes of José Luis López Vázquez, Alfredo Landa, Andrés Pajares, and Fernando Esteso. A new wave of popular and reactionary mainstream comedy films came to be collectively known as landismo –after Alfredo Landa, a recurring appearance in many of those films playing foreign-women-preying "Latin lover" types–, which was a cultural phenomenon in the 1970s.

=== Modern era ===
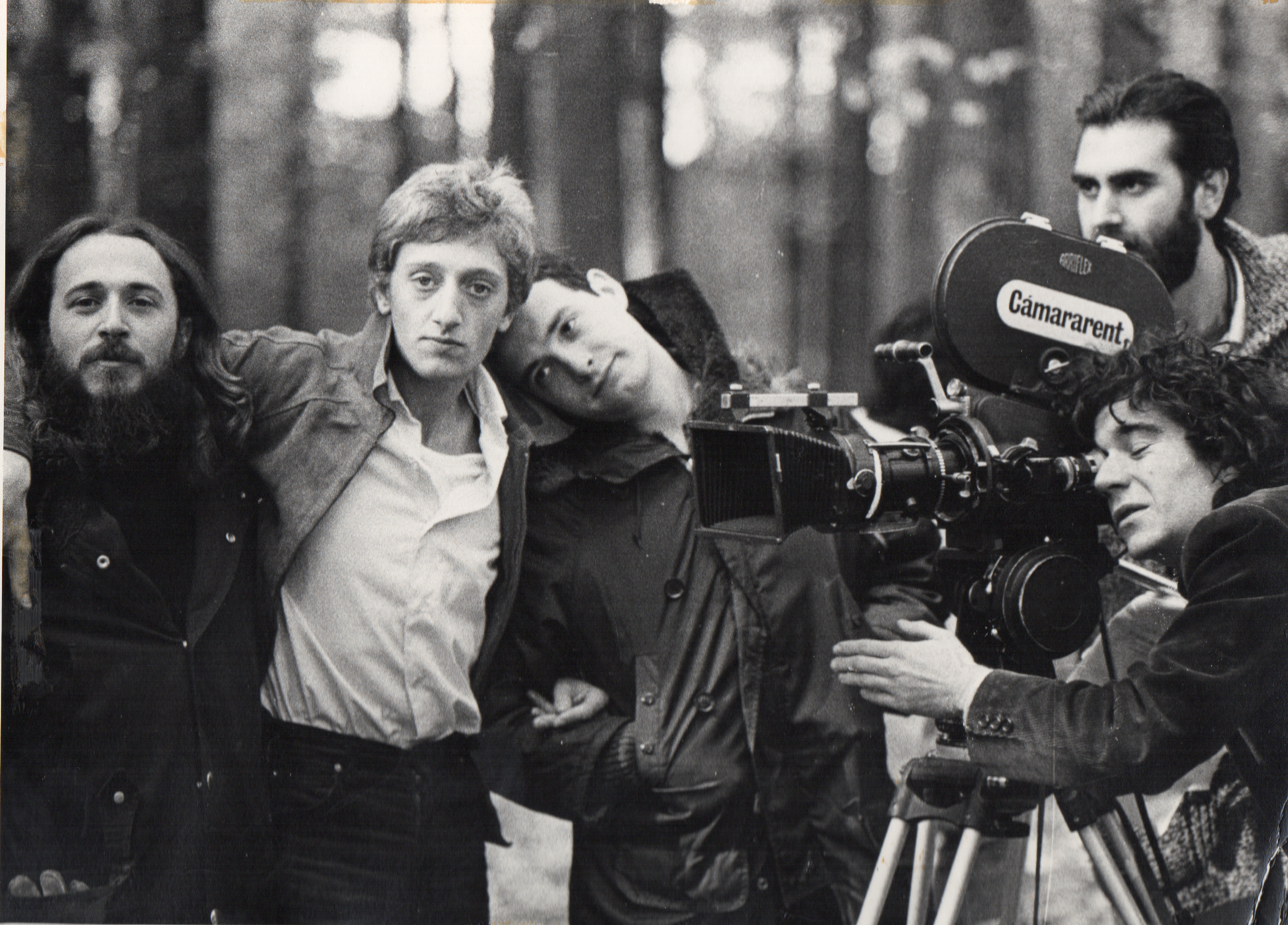
Juan Molina, Quique San Francisco (a prominent cine quinqui actor), Polo Aledo, Enrique Viciano and Óscar Ladoire in 1978

With the end of dictatorship in the mid-1970s, censorship greatly loosened and cultural works were permitted in other languages spoken in Spain besides Spanish, resulting in the founding of the Centro Galego de Artes da Imaxe or the Institut del Cinema Català, among others. Also with the end of censorship and repression came a commercial cinema—of low quality and minimal cost—with high erotic content and gratuitous nudity—mostly feminine, which was called cine de destape and lasted until the early 1980s.

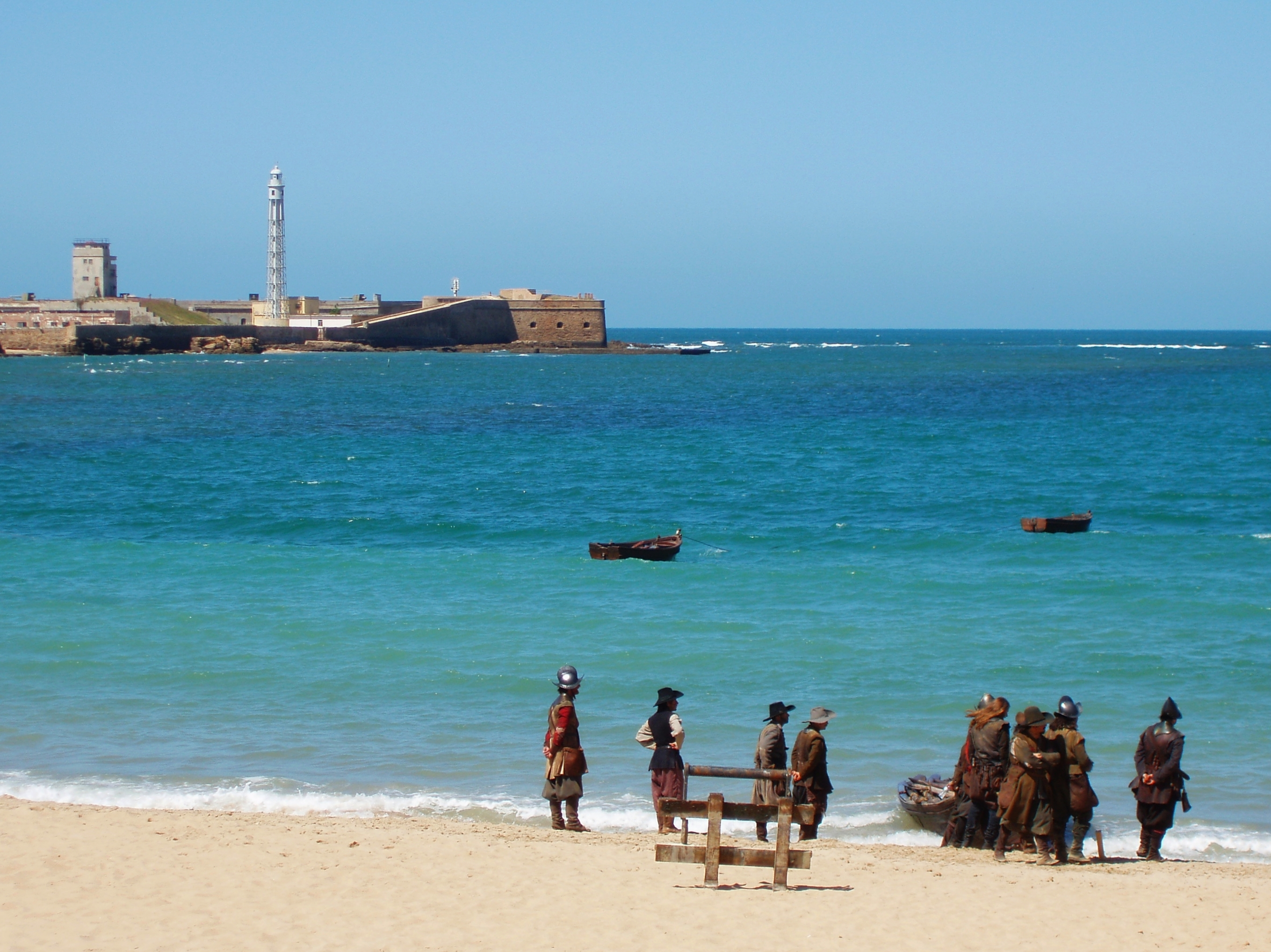
Shooting of Alatriste (Agustín Díaz Yanes, 2005) in Cádiz. At the time of its release, Alatriste was the most expensive Spanish film ever.

In the context of the Spanish Transition, the so-called cine quinqui—whose prominent exponents include Eloy de la Iglesia and José Antonio de la Loma—was particularly popular from 1977 to 1987, and approached taboo issues from a sensationalist angle, criminalizing the lumpenproletariat. These films (whose lead performers sometimes were delinquent themselves) also contributed to the promotion of a symbolic violence associated with the naturalization of the punitive and non-rehabilitating function of the prison system. In the view of Germán Labrador Méndez, many of the quinqui films underpinned a true allegory of the Transition, conveying "the mythical domestication of the non-consensual socio-political forces embodied by the quinquis, as children of the working class and, above all, as young people".

Under democracy, a new series of directors based their films on controversial topics or on revising the country's history. Jaime Chávarri, Víctor Erice, José Luis Garci, Manuel Gutiérrez Aragón, Eloy de la Iglesia, Pilar Miró, and Pedro Olea were some of these. Montxo Armendáriz or Juanma Bajo Ulloa's "new Basque cinema" also arose; another prominent Basque director is Julio Médem.

But the Spanish cinema depends on the great hits of the so-called comedia madrileña of Fernando Colomo or Fernando Trueba, the sophisticated melodramas of Almodóvar, Alex de la Iglesia and Santiago Segura's black humor and Alejandro Amenábar's work, such that, according to producer José Antonio Félez, "fifty per cent of total box office revenues comes from five titles, and between eight and ten films give eighty per cent of the total" in 2004.

Foreign films often dominate box offices in Spain, with average monthly receipts of €35–50 million, making Spain the tenth-largest country in the world for international theatrical release, with a total gross of US$ 193,304,925 in 2020, giving Spain a worldwide market share of 1.8%.

== Festivals ==
Established in 1953, the annual San Sebastian International Film Festival is a major film festival accredited by the FIAPF, and is considered the most important film festival in Spain. Notable guests have included Alfred Hitchcock, Audrey Hepburn, Steven Spielberg, Gregory Peck, and Elizabeth Taylor.

The Sitges Film Festival, officially known as the Sitges International Fantastic Film Festival of Catalonia, was established in 1968. It is an annual event for horror, science fiction, and fantasy cinema.

Other notable Spanish film festivals include the Valladolid International Film Festival and the Seville European Film Festival. Held between September and November, these autumn festivals serve as the primary platform for premiering major Spanish films on the domestic commercial circuit. Meanwhile the Málaga Film Festival, focused on Spanish and Ibero-American films, is generally held in early spring.

== Awards ==
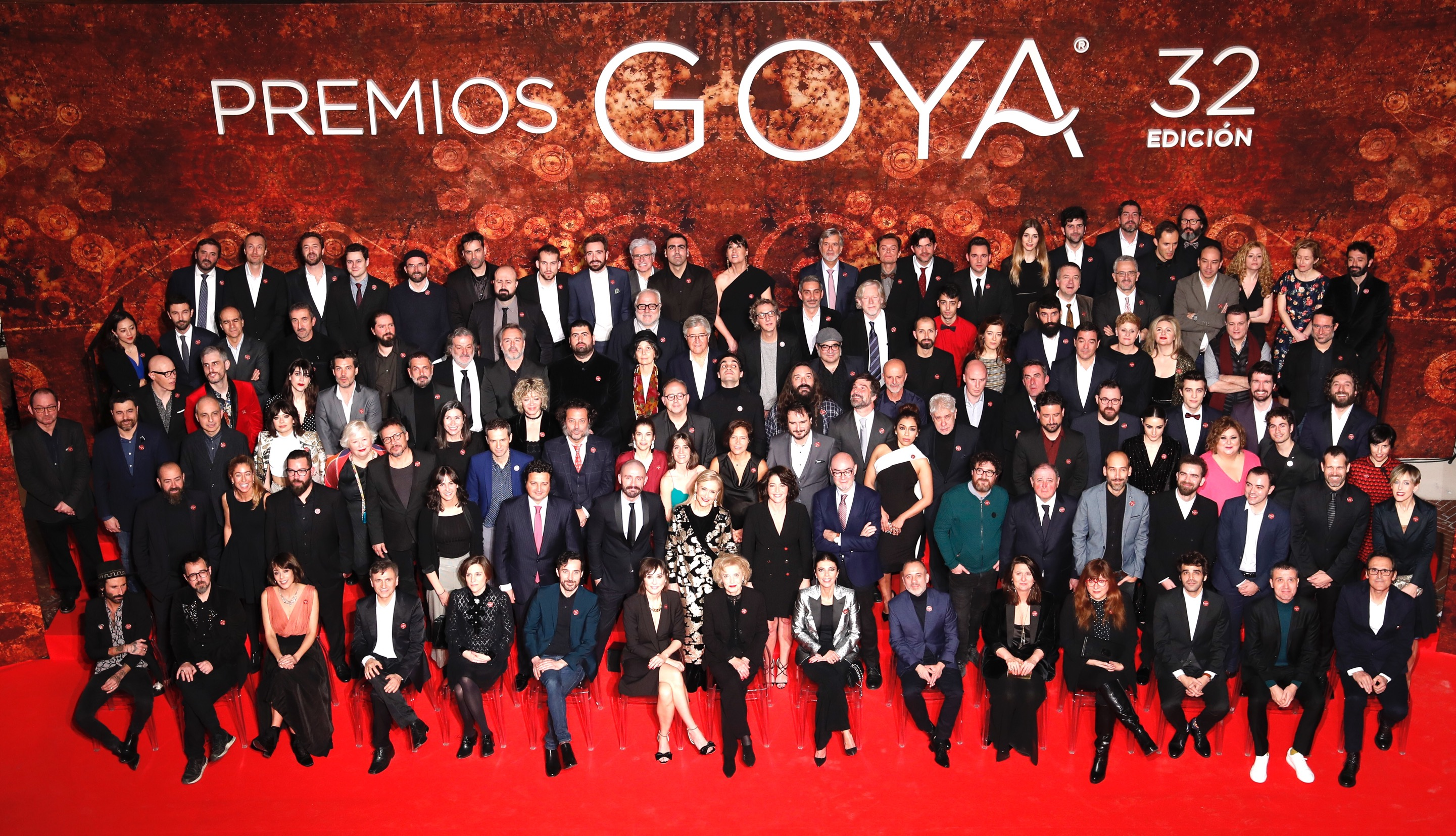
Nominees gathered for the 32nd Goya Awards in 2018

The Goya Awards are Spain's primary national film awards. Established in 1987, a year after the founding of the Academy of Cinematographic Arts and Sciences of Spain, to recognise achievements in categories such as acting, directing, and screenwriting. The inaugural ceremony took place on 16 March 1987 at the Lope de Vega Theatre, Madrid. Held annually around late January, the award honors films released during the previous year. The trophy is a bronze bust of Francisco de Goya created by the sculptor José Luis Fernández.

The Feroz Awards were established In 2013 by the Asociación de Informadores Cinematográficos de España, an association of entertainment journalists and critics.

Notable regional film and television include Galicia's Mestre Mateo Awards presented by the Academia Galega do Audiovisual the Gaudí Awards from Catalonia, presented by the Catalan Film Academy the Lola Gaos Awards from the Valencian Community, presented by the Acadèmia Valenciana de l'Audiovisual and the Carmen Awards from Andalusia, presented by the Academia de Cine de Andalucía

== Funding ==
A large portion of the funding for Spanish films is secured prior to theatrical release through pre-sales to public and private broadcasters, government subsidies, tax rebates, and streaming platforms. Public broadcasting pre-sales are primarily driven by Radiotelevisión Española, while private options include Atresmedia and Mediaset. Subsidies are granted by the ICAA as well as regional and provincial administrations. Pre-sales can cover 60–70% of the budget for a film with an average cost of €2.5 million. This funding model, which aims to reach the break-even point before theatrical exhibition, has been criticized within the industry for potentially discouraging commercial success. The AIE (Spanish: agrupación de interés económico; English: economic interest grouping) legal form is used as a tax vehicle to take advantage of rebates.

== Box office ==
=== Highest-grossing films ===
Highest-grossing films of all time in Spain
Rank	Year	Title	Domestic gross (million €)
1	2014	Spanish Affair	56.2
2	2012	The Impossible	42.4
3	2015	Spanish Affair 2	36.1
4	2001	The Others	27.3
5	2016	A Monster Calls	26.5
6	2007	The Orphanage	25.1
7	2003	Mortadelo & Filemon: The Big Adventure	22.8
8	2001	Torrente 2: Mission in Marbella	22.1
9	2009	Agora	21.4
10	2017	Perfect Strangers	21.3

== See also ==
- Media of Spain
- Lists of Spanish films
- List of Spanish Academy Award winners and nominees
- Spanish animation
- Spanish art
- Catalan cinema
- Cinema of Galicia
- Sant Jordi Awards
- Cinema of the world
- World cinema
