= María Guerrero López =

Spanish actress

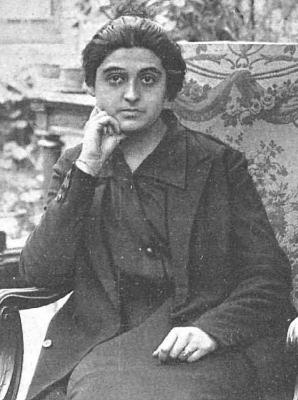
1925

María Guerrero López (1906 – 24 March 1994) was a Spanish actress.

== Biography ==
María Guerrero López was born into a theatre family in Madrid. She was a niece of the celebrated María Guerrero Torija whose stage name she shared. She studied at Madrid's College of Saint Louis of France ("Colegio de San Luis de los Franceses de Madrid") and made her stage debut in September 1919, while still a child, appearing with the theatre company of her aunt and uncle.

That first appearance was in "Campo de armiño" by Jacinto Benavente, in which she appeared at the Teatro Odeón in Buenos Aires. Her Madrid debut followed in February 1920 at the Teatro de la Princesa (as it was then known), in "La Dolores" by Feliu i Codina. Numerous further roles followed, in plays such as "La vidriera milagrosa" (1924), "Doña Diabla" (1925), both by Luis Fernández Ardavín, and "Desdichas de la fortuna o Julianillo Valcárcel" (1926) by the Machado brothers.

In 1927 she married, as his second wife, her first cousin, Fernando Díaz de Mendoza y Guerrero (1897-1942). (His first wife had died in 1919.) Her husband was heir to the family theatre company and by now also father, outside wedlock, of the (later famous actor-director) Fernando Fernán Gómez, although he never acknowledged his paternity. He now produced three more children in his marriage with María Guerrero López. Shortly after their marriage the couples' parents (in Maria' case aunt and uncle) died, and they took over the family theatre company, concentrating on classics such as La Estrella de Sevilla and El Perro del Hortelano (The Dog in the Manger, 1931). They also presented several premiers including La florista de la Reina (The Queen's Florist, 1940) by Ardavín.

Fernando Díaz de Mendoza y Guerrero was killed in 1942 when the ship on which he was travelling was sunk by a German submarine. Maria embarked on a solo career, also sometimes teaming up with José Romeu. There were notable box office successes in Madrid with productions such as La hidalga limosnera (1944) by José María Pemán, Doña María la Brava (1944) by Eduardo Marquina, Sangre negra (1963) by Guillermo Sautier Casaseca and Las de Caín (1982) by the Quintero brothers.

She had a movie career. She starred in the movie version of Ardavín's "La florista de la Reina" (1940) and later in Clemente Pamplona's Farmacia de guardia (1958). She also appeared in various television production including the long running Novela series.
