= The Unloved Woman (play) =

1913 Spanish play

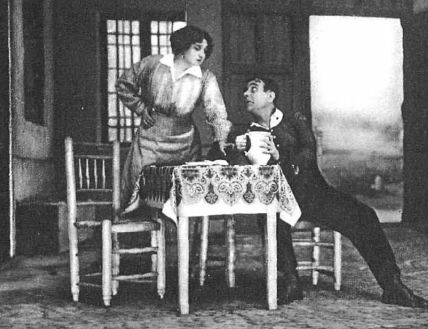
A performance of the play featuring María Guerrero

The Unloved Woman (Spanish: La malquerida) is a 1913 play by the Spanish writer Jacinto Benavente. A rural drama, It has been adapted a number of times for films and television including the 1921 American silent film The Passion Flower, the 1940 Spanish film The Unloved Woman and the 1949 Mexican film The Unloved Woman. John Garrett Underhill translated the work into English under the title The Passion Flower.

The play premiered on 12 December 1913 at the Teatro de la Princesa. It starred María Guerrero as Raimunda and María Fernanda Ladrón de Guevara as Acacia along with the likes of Irene López Heredia, Carmen Ruiz Moragas, Fernando Díaz de Mendoza, Ricardo Juste, and Ernesto Vilches (as El Rubio).

== Bibliography ==
- Goble, Alan. The Complete Index to Literary Sources in Film. Walter de Gruyter, 1999.
