= Gelabert =

Gelabert is a surname. Notable people with the surname include:

- Antonio Gelabert (1921–1956), Spanish road bicycle racer
- César Gelabert (born 2000), Spanish footballer
- Conchita Gélabert (1857–1922), French lyrical artist and actress
- Damaris Gelabert (born 1965), Catalan singer
- Francisco de Paula Gelabert (1758 – c. 1832), Royal Governor of West Florida
- Fructuós Gelabert (1874–1955), Catalan inventor and screenwriter
- Hortensia Gelabert (?–1958), Cuban-born actress
- Juanmi Gelabert (born 1972), Spanish footballer
- Marcos Gelabert (born 1981), Argentine footballer
- Pedro A. Gelabert (born 1933), Puerto Rican scientist and politician

== See also ==
- Francisco Gelaberti (born 1935), Argentine boxer
