= Mari Carmen Díaz de Mendoza =

Spanish theatre actress

María Carmen Díaz de Mendoza Larrabeiti
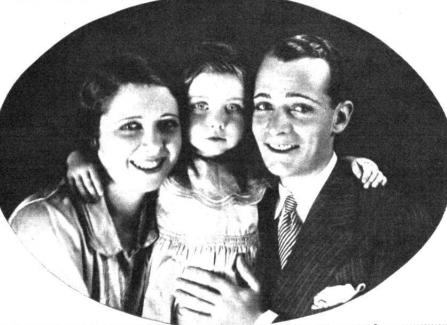
- María Carmen Díaz de Mendoza Larrabeiti: with her parents
- Born: 1 December 1927; Madrid, Spain
- Died: 11 March 2018 (aged 90); Madrid, Spain
- Occupation: Theatre actress
- Spouse: José Beltrán de Heredia (1914-1992)
- Partner(s): Carlos Díaz de Mendoza; Carmen Larrabeiti

María Carmen Díaz de Mendoza Larrabeiti (December 1, 1927 – March 11, 2018) was a Spanish theatre actress.

== Life ==
Mari Carmen Díaz de Mendoza was born in Madrid towards the end of 1927. Her parents, Carlos Díaz de Mendoza and Carmen Larrabeiti, who were both actors, had married the previous year. Her paternal grand parents were also highly successful in the world of theatre. Although Mari Carmen made one or two film appearances, the focus of her own acting career was the theatre.

She embarked on her stage career in the 1940s at the Theatre of María Guerrero, originally purchased by her grandfather, the theatrical impresario Fernando Díaz de Mendoza y Aguado, back in 1908. In 1944 she appeared in a play based on Dostoyevsky's "Demons", playing opposite Ricardo Calvo Agostí. Another early role was in the Spanish translation of "Time and the Conways" by J. B. Priestley, in which she appeared with Guillermo Marín and Elvira Noriega. A few months later she transferred to the Teatro Español, in June 1945 appearing in "Hamlet" with Marin and Mercedes Prendes.

During the next few years she appeared in "Tres de madrugada" by Claudio de la Torre (1946), "Cuento de cuentos" by Joaquín Dicenta (the younger) (1947) and after setting up her own theatre company, in "Víspera de bodas" by Eduardo Manzanos (1948), in which Milagros Leal and Salvador Soler Marí also appeared.

She was part of the production of En la ardiente oscuridad by Antonio Buero Vallejo, which had its triumphant premier in December 1950 at the Teatro María Guerrero. There were other successes during the early 1950s in the theatre that still bore her grandmother's name, including "María Antonieta" (1952) and "El jefe" (1953) by Joaquín Calvo Sotelo, "Berkeley Square" (1952) by John L. Balderston and "Recién llegada" (1953), by Keith Winter.

Later in the decade Díaz de Mendoza switched to Madrid's Teatro de la Comedia where she shared the stage with Alberto Closas in "¿De acuerdo, Susana?" (1955) and appeared in "Mi adorado Juan" (1956) by Miguel Mihura, with Ismael Merlo, as well as featuring with Carlos Muñoz in "En cualquier Puerta del Sol" (1956) by Carlos Llopis and in "48 horas de felicidad" (1956) by Alfonso Paso. In 1957 she was in La malquerida by Jacinto Benavente, a piece which had premiered 45 years earlier, with her grandmother heading up the cast.

Towards the end of 1957 she returned to the Theatre of María Guerrero for the premier of "El cuervo" by then the young Alfonso Sastre. 1958 was a particularly rich year for Díaz de Mendoza, which included appearances in "Alta fidelidad" by Edgar Neville, "Tránsito de madrugada" by Santiago Moncada, "Las manos son inocentes" by José López Rubio, "The Teahouse of the August Moon" by John Patrick and "Vida moderna" by Álvaro de Laiglesia. In each of these she starred opposite Ángel Picazo. A year later, after playing in a theatrical version of La vida en un hilo by Edgar Neville, she retired from the stage.

She had no children and died on 11 March 2018.

== Personal ==
Mari Carmen Díaz de Mendoza was married in September 1959 to José Beltrán de Heredia, a professor of civil law initially at Salamanca and later in Madrid. He died in 1992.
