= Luis Fernando Díaz de Mendoza y Guerrero =

Spanish actor (1897–1942)

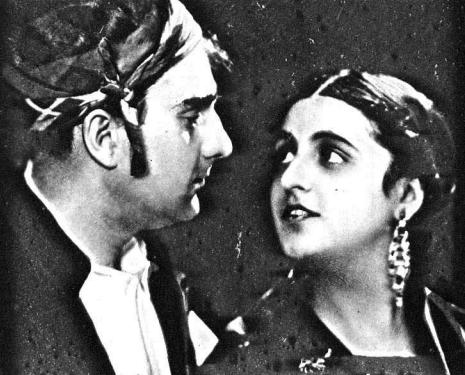
Luis Fernando Díaz de Mendoza Guerrero appearing with his second wife (and first cousin), María Guerrero López (1930)

Luis Fernando Díaz de Mendoza y Guerrero (5 March 1897 – 27 September 1942) was a Spanish actor.

He died when the ship on which he was travelling was sunk by a submarine.

== Life ==
Luis Fernando Díaz de Mendoza y Guerrero was born on a Friday in Madrid, into one of Spain's leading theatre families. His father was the actor-impresario Fernando Díaz de Mendoza y Aguado (1862-1930): his mother, María Guerrero, was a prominent actress and theatre director. He was therefore steeped in theatrical interpretation, making his stage debut as a child, as did his younger brother, Carlos.

Until his parents died, he was part of their company. He was in the cast in works such as "Campo de armiño" ("Field of Ermine") (1916) and "Los cachorros" ("The Puppies") (1918), both by Jacinto Benavente, "El último pecado" ("The Final Sin") (1918) by Pedro Muñoz Seca, "Lady Windermere's Fan" (1920) by Oscar Wilde, "El padre Juanico" ("Father Juanico") (1922) by Àngel Guimerà, "Don Luis Mejía" (1925) by Eduardo Marquina, "El doncel romántico" ("The Romantic Gift") (1922), "La vidriera milagrosa" ("The Miraculous Window") (1924) and "Doña Diabla" ("The She-Devil") (1925), the last three all by Luis Fernández Ardavín, along with "Desdichas de la fortuna o Julianillo Valcárcel" ("The Misfortunes of Julianillo Valcárcel") (1926) by the brothers Machado.

He also worked with other theatre companies, for instance when he appeared in "El llanto" ("The Crying") (1924) by Pedro Muñoz Seca, with Emilio Thuillier.

After his parents died, in 1928 and 1930, he continued to run the family theatre company with his (second) wife.

== Personal ==
His first marriage took place in Bilbao on 27 August 1917 and was to María O'Donell y Díaz de Mendoza. She died two years later.

He later became involved with the actress Carola Fernán Gómez who gave birth to Fernando Fernán Gómez, one of the most notable Spanish actors of the twentieth century. Díaz de Mendoza y Guerrero never acknowledged his paternity in public, however.

His second marriage took place in 1927 and was to his first cousin, the actress María Guerrero López, with whom he had two or three more children.

Fernando Díaz de Mendoza y Guerrero died in the Atlantic Ocean, roughly 60 km to the southwest of Martinique. The Monte Gorbea (as the Arantza Mendi was renamed in 1939) was a 20-year-old multi-use cargo ship, with approximately 30 passenger cabins. On 19 September 1942, travelling from Buenos Aires to Bilbao with a stopover for provisioning at Curaçao, she was torpedoed by a German submarine, identified as U-512. The boat was painted in neutral colours, but the German submarine captain became convinced that she was a British vessel disguised as a Spanish one. After the atrocity the submarine was ordered back to German-occupied France, where the captain was to face a court martial, but it was sunk by an American air attack without ever getting back to Europe. The Monte Gorbea carried a crew of 47, of whom 23 died when the ship was sunk. There were also 23 passengers, of whom 19 died. Díaz de Mendoza was one of these.
