= The Queen's Flower Girl =

- Directed by: Eusebio Fernández Ardavín
- Written by: Luis Fernández Ardavín (play); Rafael Gil
- Starring: Ana Mariscal; María Guerrero López; Alfredo Mayo
- Cinematography: Theodore J. Pahle
- Music by: Juan Quintero
- Production company: Ufilms
- Distributed by: Ufilms
- Release date: 1940
- Running time: 89 minutes
- Country: Spain
- Language: Spanish

The Queen's Flower Girl (Spanish:La florista de la reina) is a 1940 Spanish historical drama film directed by Eusebio Fernández Ardavín and starring Ana Mariscal, María Guerrero and Alfredo Mayo. The film is set in Madrid in the late nineteenth century. Ardavín adapted one of his own plays for the film, which was commercially successful.

== Cast ==
- María Guerrero López (niece of María Guerrero)
- Ana Mariscal
- Alfredo Mayo
- Jesús Tordesillas
- Juan Barajas
- Carmen López Lagar
- Manolita Morán
- Pedro Oltra

== Bibliography ==
- Bentley, Bernard. A Companion to Spanish Cinema. Boydell & Brewer 2008.
