= Carmen Larrabeiti =

Spanish actress

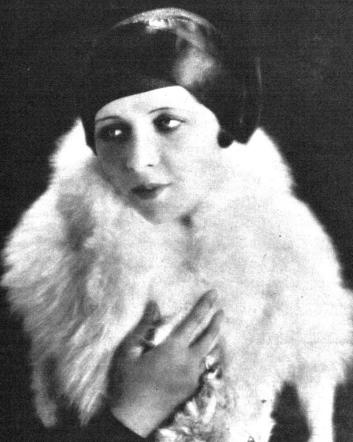
- Carmen Larrabeiti in 1931
- Born: 2 June 1904; Bilbao
- Died: 1 June 1968 (aged 63)
- Occupation: actress
- Years active: 1921–1932
- Movement: María Guerrero; Fernando Díaz de Mendoza y Aguado
- Spouse: Carlos Díaz de Mendoza

Carmen Larrabeiti Urquiza (2 June 1904 – June 1968) was a stage and screen actress from the Basque region in Spain.

== Biography ==
Carmen Larrabeiti was born in Bilbao early in the twentieth century. At the age of 17, despite parental opposition, she embarked on a stage career, joining the company run by the impresario couple María Guerrero and Fernando Díaz de Mendoza y Aguado. This gave Larrabeiti the chance to appear in works by some of the leading playwrights of the time. There were numerous tours in Argentina with the Guerrero-Mendoza company during these years.

In 1926 she married Carlos, the son of Guerrero and Mendoza. Her mother in law died in 1928 and her father in law in 1930, leaving Carlos in charge of the theatre company. However, Argentinian audiences were deserting live shows in favour of the new radio broadcasts, and a proliferation of rival theatres in Buenos Aires persuaded Larrabeiti and her husband that their future lay in Spain. They joined the Teatro Infanta Isabel in Madrid, where stage successes included their appearance in "The Bonires of St John" ("Las hogueras de San Juan" – 1930) by Juan Ignacio Luca de Tena.

By this time Larrabeiti had made her screen debut in 1926 in Alejandro Pérez Lugín's film adaptation of his own novel, "Currito of the Cross (Currito de la Cruz)". She moved on to Paris with her husband, working on the Paramount productions "Doña Mentiras" (1930), "Toda una vida" (1930) "La Carta" (1931) and "La fiesta del diablo" (1931). In February 1931 she embarked for New York, accompanied by her husband, arriving on 17 March. She signed a six-month contract with 20th Century Fox, which ran till 27 September 1931. During her time with Fox she recorded a series of Spanish language voice-overs for various Hollywood blockbusters including David Howard's "Esclavas de la moda" ("On Your Back") and "Conoces a tu mujer?" ("Don't Bet on Women") with Rafael Rivelles.

She returned to Spain in 1932 suffering an attack of partial paralysis which ruled out further acting work.

Carmen Larrabeiti died in Madrid on 26 June 1968. Her husband had sustained a career in theatre and film during the 1940s and 1950s, but had died in 1960. By this time their daughter, Mari Carmen Díaz de Mendoza, had established her own career as a Madrid based actress.
