= María Tubau =

Spanish actress

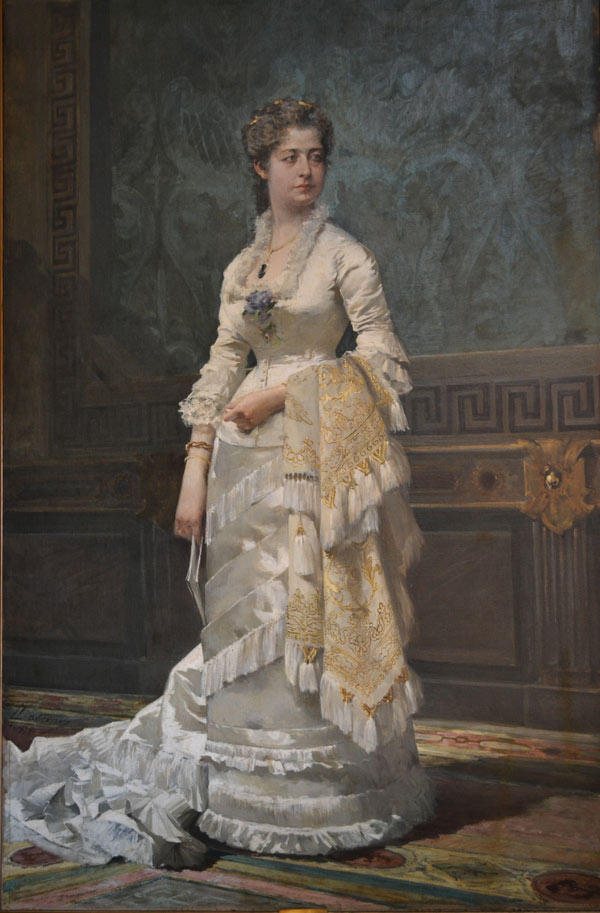
- 1878 portrait of María Tubau in The Lady of the Camellias by Luis Taberner y Montalvo
- Born: María Álvarez Tubau; 1854; Madrid, Spain
- Died: 13 March 1914 (aged 59–60); Madrid, Spain
- Occupation: Actress
- Spouse: Ceferino Palencia

María Álvarez Tubau (1854 – 13 March 1914) was a Spanish actress, a contemporary of María Guerrero.

== Biography ==
María Álvarez Tubau was born in Madrid, the daughter of Mercedes Tubau of Barcelona and Manuel Álvarez Robles of Avilés. She began acting at age 12, together with Matilde Diez, completing her training with Vico at the Teatro Apolo and with Mario at the Teatro de la Comedia. She achieved some popularity as a comic actress in the romantic drama genre. After marrying for the first time and being widowed in 1877, she married again in 1882, to the playwright and theater director Ceferino Palencia. He reignited her career, making her one of the leading performers of the Madrid scene. Together they formed their own theatrical company at the Teatro de la Princesa.

She performed works by contemporary Spanish playwrights such as Vital Aza, Miguel Ramos Carrión, Eusebio Blasco, and Benito Pérez Galdós (in a unique and controversial interpretation of his Doña Perfecta which premiered in 1896). She also staged works by Enlightenment Neoclassicists such as Leandro Fernández de Moratín, Manuel Bretón de los Herreros, Henry Bataille, Victorien Sardou, and Alexandre Dumas, fils.

At age 37 she was named "Doctor in Dramatic Art" in a document published in 1891 and signed by José Zorrilla, Núñez de Arce, Campoamor, Emilio Castelar, and José Echegaray, among other journalists, politicians, and intellectuals of the era.

She toured Spain and America, and in 1904 became a professor at the Madrid Royal Conservatory. She died in 1914.
