= Hortensia Gelabert =

Spanish stage actor

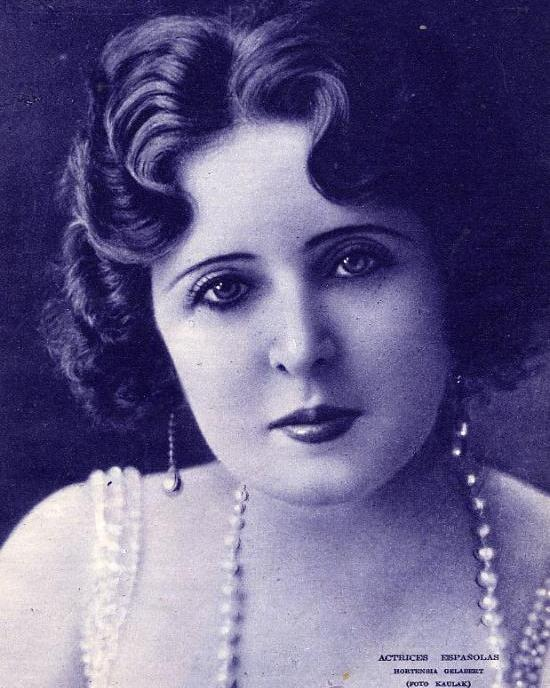
- Born: ?1896 ?Trinidad, Cuba
- Died: 4 November 1958; Havana, Cuba
- Occupation(s): Stage actress (spain) movie actress (spain) professor of oratory (cuba) radio and television actress (cuba)
- Spouse: Emilio Thuillier (1868–1940)

Hortensia Gelabert (? – 4 November 1958) was a Cuban-born Actor who moved to Europe early in her career, most of which she built and sustained in Spain. Although she made her film debut as early as 1911, her public impact derived principally from her work as a stage actress.

== Early life ==
Hortensia Gelabert was born on Cuba. At least one source gives her birth date as 29 December 1896 and her place of birth as the town of Trinidad, a coastal municipality on the south side of the island: other sources state that there is considerable uncertainty over when, and where on Cuba, she was born. She arrived in Spain in around 1910.

== Career ==
She very soon made her cinema debut, shooting six movies between 1911 and 1924. These included "El Fantasma del Castillo" (1911: "The Phantom of the Castle") and "La Mano y Deuda Pagada" (1916: "The Hand and the Debt Paid") and "El talismán" (1917). After 1924, there would only be one more movie role. That came towards the end of her career in Spain, when in 1939 she appeared in a Sound film, "Los hijos de la noche" ("The Children of the Night"), a light-hearted comedy based on the stage-play of the same name by Adolfo Torrado and directed by another Cuban-Spanish artist, Benito Perojo, at the vast Cinecittà studios in Rome.

However, her larger successes came from her work as a stage actress. In 1910 she appeared at Madrid's Comedia Theatre in the premier of Genio y figura, a three-act comedy about an aging seducer, by Carlos Arniches (and others). The next year she joined the María Guerrero theatre company, starring in a rapid succession of premiers that included El alcázar de las perlas (1911) by Francisco Villaespesa, El rey trovador (1911) by Eduardo Marquina, Primavera en otoño (1911) by Gregorio Martínez Sierra, Doña Desdenes (1912) by Manuel Linares Rivas, La marquesa Rosalinda (1912) by Ramón del Valle-Inclán and El delito (1915) by Luis Fernández Ardavín and the young Federico García Sanchiz.

During her stage career Hortensia Gelabert frequently appeared with Emilio Thuillier. At some stage the two of them married. Some of the works in which they appeared together were La ciudad alegre y confiada (1916), La Inmaculada de los Dolores (1918) and La honra de los hombres (1919), all by Jacinto Benavente. Others were Febrerillo, el loco (1919) by the Quintero brothers, Una noche de primavera sin sueño (1927) by Enrique Jardiel Poncela and Un marido ideal (1928) by Oscar Wilde. During the 1920s Gelabert was a leading figure in the world of Spanish theatre, effectively managing her own theatre company according to some sources The "Compañía de Comedias de Hortensia Gelabert" continued to perform till the early months of 1936, though it appears that during the later part of that period Gelabert herself was no longer involved in its productions. In 1931 she abruptly withdrew from her stage work. It is not clear what triggered the move, although later commentators have made a connection with plans that she seems to have had to open a fashion boutique in Madrid. There is no mention of her involvement with any fashion boutique project in contemporary media sources, however. There is an eye-catching reference to her having celebrated the Feast of the Epiphany in January 1931 by visiting the Madrid women's prison with the dramatist Jacinto Benavente, on a mission to distribute toys to the boys and girls incarcerated with their mothers. Press coverage indicated approvingly that the two of them had found a charitable use for the profits from the success of one of their shared theatrical venture.

After the Civil War ended, Gelabert underwent a brief return to fame with her appearance as Donna Irene in Benito Perojo's 1939 cinema version of "Los hijos de la noche" ("The Children of the Night"). There were actually two distinctive version produced at the same time, but the same cast of actors appeared in both versions. Her husband died in Madrid the next summer, and at around the same time Hortensia Gelabert returned to the land of her birth, Cuba. Settling in Havana she took a position as "Profesora de Declamación" {loosely, "Professor of rhetoric and oratory"} at the city's "Conservatorio Municipal", where her students included the stage performer, radio presenter and revolutionary heroine, Alicia Fernán. Gelabert was also heard on Cuban radios during this time, acting in radio dramas.

Later, for some years she made frequent appearances in the early Cuban television dramas, many of which were adaptations of stage classics that she already knew intimately from her years on the theatre stages in Madrid.

There are suggestions that Hortensia Gelabert may have been planning to visit Spain when she died at Havana on 4 November 1958. In the event, however, and as far as is known, she never returned to Spain after moving to Cuba in 1940.
