= Damaris =

Damaris may refer to:

== As a given name ==
- Damaris (biblical figure), woman mentioned in the New Testament
- Damaris Aguirre (born 1977), Mexican weightlifter
- Damaris Cudworth Masham (1659–1708), English philosopher
- Damaris Egurrola (born 1999), Spanish footballer
- Damaris Evans (born 1975), British fashion designer and creative director
- Damaris Gelabert (born 1965), Catalan singer
- Damaris Hayman (1929–2021), British actress
- Damaris Johnson (born 1989), American footballer
- Damaris Lewis (born 1990) American model
- Damaris Mallma Porras (born 1986), Peruvian folk singer
- Damaris Page (1610–1669) also known as "Damarose Page", London brothel keeper, entrepreneur and property developer
- Damaris Phillips (born 1980), American chef

== Other uses ==
- "Damaris", song by Patrick Wolf from The Bachelor
- "Damaris", song by The Rentals from Lost in Alphaville

== See also ==
- Damari
