= Rafael Calvo =

Rafael Calvo may refer to:

- Rafael Calvo Ruiz de Morales (1886–1966), Spanish theatre and film actor
- Rafael Luis Calvo (1911–1988), Spanish film actor, son of the above
- Rafael Calvo Serer (1916–1988), Spanish academic, writer and essayist
- Rafael Calvo Ortega (1933–2025), Spanish politician, minister of labour in 1978–1980
- Rafael Calvo Revilla (1842–1888), Spanish theatre actor, collaborated with Antonio Vico y Pintos
