= Antonio Vico =

Antonio Vico may refer to:

- Antonio Vico (cardinal) (1847–1929), cardinal of the Catholic Church
- Antonio Vico y Pintos (1840–1940), Spanish stage actor
