= Riña en un café =

1897 film by Fructuós Gelabert

Riña en un café (Spanish: "café quarrel") Spanish short silent film directed by Fructuós Gelabert.

It is considered the first Spanish film with a plot.

== See also ==
- Cinema of Spain
- List of Spanish films before 1930
