= Teatro Odeón =

Former theatre in Buenos Aires, Argentina

Coordinates: 34°36′13″S 58°22′39″W

The Teatro Odeón

The Odeon Theater (Teatro Odeón in Spanish) was a theater in Buenos Aires, Argentina. It was built by Don Emilio Bieckert in the end of the 19th century. In July 1896, it hosted the first ever film screening in Argentina. It was demolished in 1991 in order to make space for the construction of a parking lot.

Currently the Odeon Tower is being built on the site, and a new theater is being built on one side of the tower to replace the former.

== Major performances ==
- 1897, Maria Guerrero and Fernando Diaz de Mendoza
- 1898, María Tubau
- 1903, Carmen Cobeña, André Antoine
- 1907, Enrique Borrás
- 1913, Leopoldo Lugones
- 1927, Luigi Pirandello
- 1937, Margarita Xirgu
- 1950, Madeleine Renaud and Jean Louis Barrault
- 1951, Diana Torrieri and Vittorio Gassman
- 1954, Giorgio Strehler and Paolo Grassi
- 1962, Niní Marshall
- 1967, Libertad Lamarque
- 1976, Nati Mistral

== Principal concerts ==
- Wilhelm Kempff
- Astor Piazzolla
- Luis Alberto Spinetta
- Carlos Gardel
- Osvaldo Pugliese
- Andrés Segovia

== Gallery ==
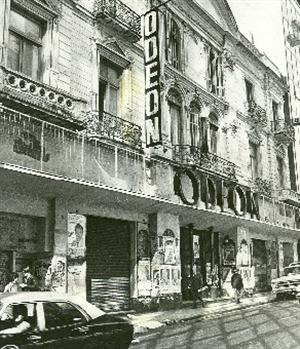
Main entrance in 1985.

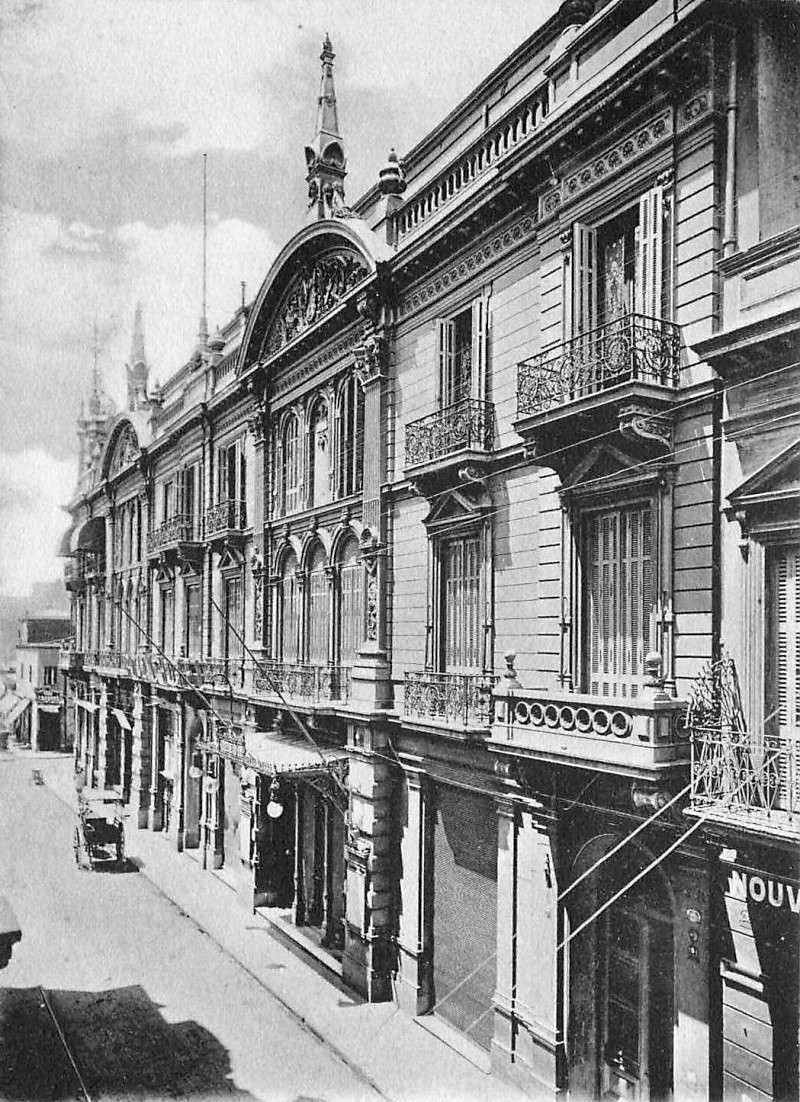
View of Esmeralda street.

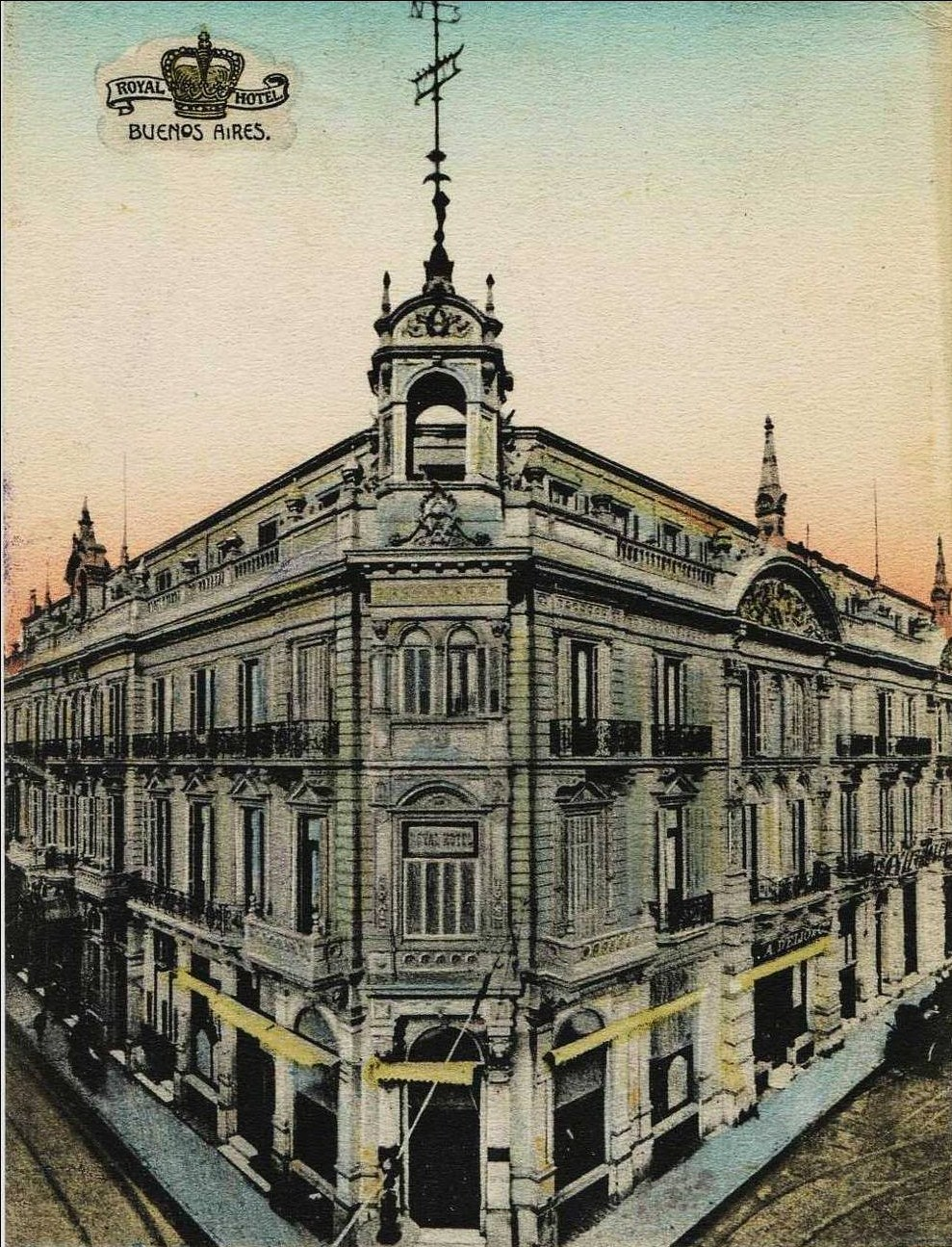
Royal Hotel and Teatro Odeón.

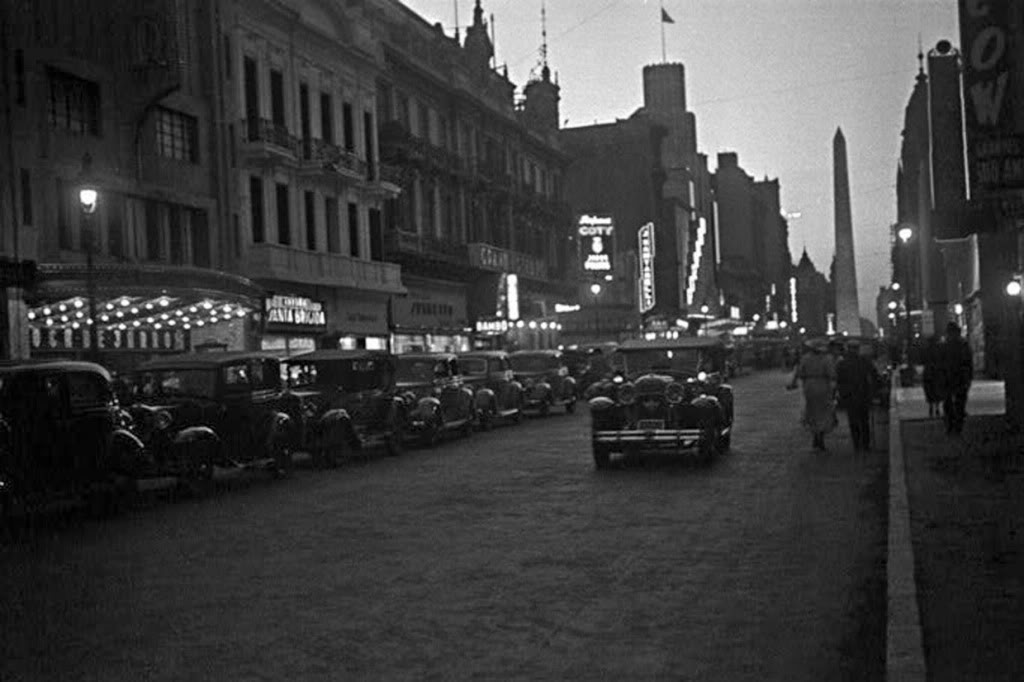
Photo of Horacio Coppola.
