= The Passion Flower =

1921 film by Herbert Brenon

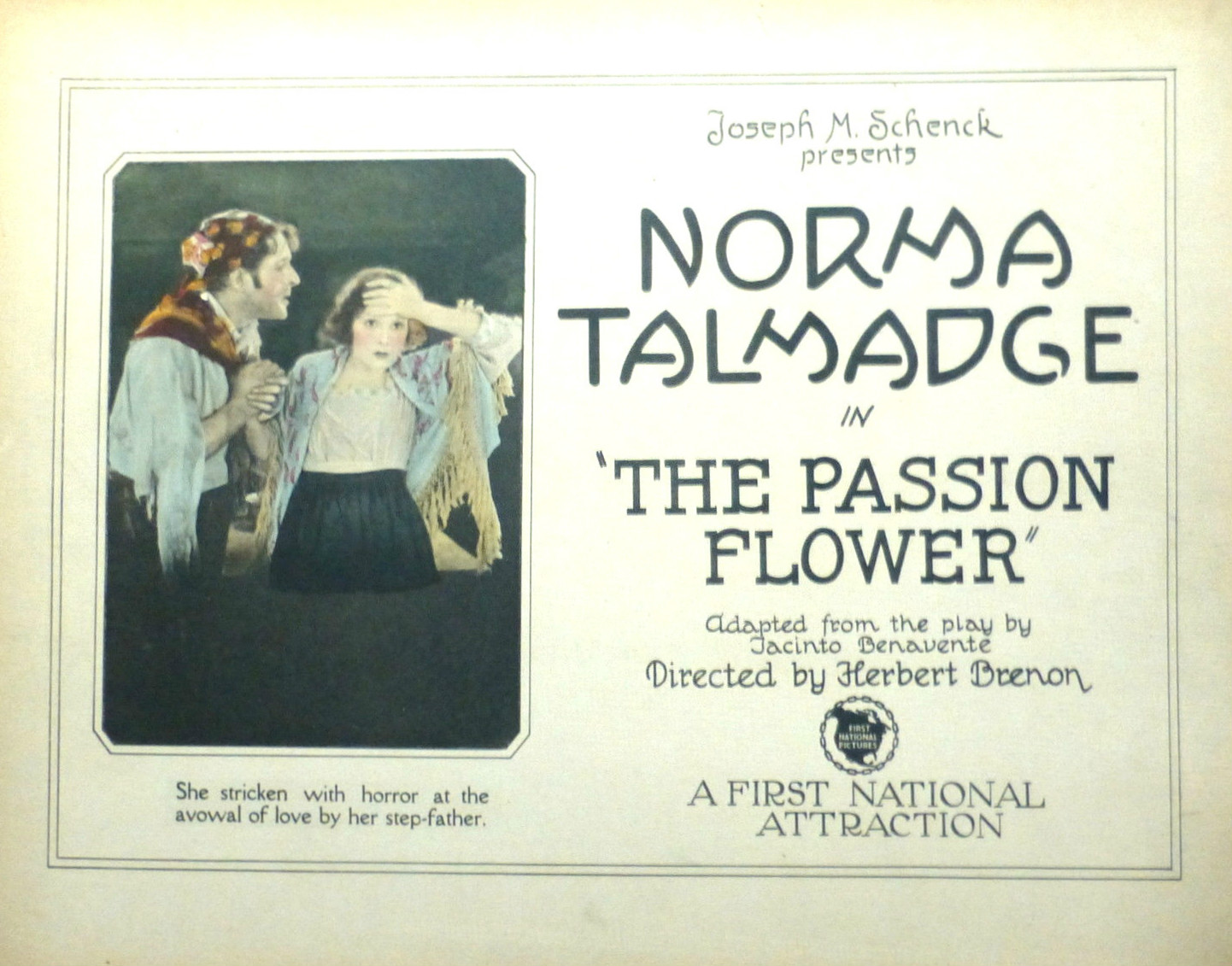
- Lobby card
- Directed by: Herbert Brenon
- Written by: Herbert Brenon; Mary Murillo
- Based on: play The Unloved Woman by Jacinto Benavente
- Produced by: Norma Talmadge
- Starring: Norma Talmadge; Courtenay Foote; Eulalie Jensen
- Cinematography: J. Roy Hunt
- Production company: Norma Talmadge Film Corporation
- Distributed by: Associated First National Pictures
- Release date: April 3, 1921
- Running time: 84 minutes
- Country: United States
- Language: Silent (English intertitles)
- Box office: $182,039.88

The Passion Flower is a 1921 American silent drama film starring Norma Talmadge, Courtenay Foote, and Eulalie Jensen, and directed by Herbert Brenon. It is based on the 1913 Spanish play The Unloved Woman (Spanish: La malquerida) by Jacinto Benavente. The play was translated into English by John Garrett Underhill as The Passion Flower and successfully produced in 1920 in New York City. The plot of the film involves the forbidden love of a man for his stepdaughter which leads to tragedy and murder.

== Plot ==
As described in a film publication, Esteban's jealousy for his stepdaughter Acacia results in his servant Rubio telling Acacia's sweetheart Norbert that she loves another. Their betrothal is broken, and later Acacia accepts Faustino. Rubio kills Faustino, and Norbert is tried for the crime but acquitted. When it becomes known that Esteban was the cause of the murder, he flees into the mountains, but later returns to give himself up. Raimunda, Acacia's mother and Esteban's wife, pleads with Acacia to accept the stepfather whom she hates. During the long embrace which follows between Esteban and Acacia, Raimunda learns of Esteban's love for his stepdaughter and her own love turns to hate. Raimunda calls for help and during Esteban's attempt to escape with Acacia he shoots his wife and is then arrested. Raimunda dies in the arms of Acacia.

== Cast ==
- Norma Talmadge as Acacia, The Passion Flower
- Courtenay Foote as Esteban
- Eulalie Jensen as Raimunda
- Harrison Ford as Norbert
- Charles A. Stevenson as Tio Eusebio
- Alice May as Julia Eusebio
- H. D. McClellan as a Eusebio son
- Austin Harrison as a Eusebio son
- Herbert Vance as a Eusebio son
- Robert Agnew as Faustino Eusebio
- Harold Stern as Little Carlos
- Natalie Talmadge as Milagros
- Mrs. Jacques Martin as Old Juliana
- Elsa Fredericks as Francesca
- Robert Paton Gibbs as Norbert's father (credited as Robert Payton Gibb)
- Augustus Balfour as The Padre
- Walter Wilson as Rubio
- Mildred Adams as Doña Isabel
- Julian Greer as Acacia's father
- Edward Boring as Bernabe

== Court case ==
Underhill, who had translated the Spanish play into English as The Passion Flower, sued in New York state court after the play was filmed without his permission. On appeal, the opinion by Chief Judge Benjamin N. Cardozo agreed that the contractual transfer of dramatic rights to produce a play did not include films, and that Underhill deserved damages but not all profits from the film.

== Censorship ==
Before The Passion Flower could be exhibited in Kansas, the Kansas Board of Review required the removal of the embrace between Acacia and Esteban and the intertitle "To have you and to hold you like the beasts of the field that know neither father or mother."

== Preservation ==
The Library of Congress has a print of The Passion Flower, though there is a bit of deterioration in the first scene and a "lapse of continuity" near the end of this copy.
