= Damari =

Damari is both a surname and a given name. Notable people with the name include:

Surname

- Nitzan Damari (born 1987), Israeli footballer
- Omer Damari (born 1989), Israeli footballer
- Shoshana Damari (1923–2006), Israeli singer

Given name

- Damari Alston (born 2004), American football player
- Da'Mari Scott (born 1995), American football player

== See also ==
- Damaris (disambiguation)
