= Directorate General of Cinematography and Theatre =

The Directorate General of Cinematography and Theatre (Spanish: Dirección General de Cinematografía y Teatro; DGCT) was a department of the Francoist dictatorship with the rank of directorate-general charged with the control of cinema and theatre in Spain, including the scope of censorship.

== History ==
The body was created in 1946, by means of the development of a decree from 31 December 1945. The DGCT was originally attached to the Undersecretariat of Popular Education of the Ministry of National Education. Gabriel García Espina was the first leader of the new directorate general.

In the wake of the administrative restructuring of 1951, several areas were removed from the ministerial department of National Education, as the aptitude of incoming minister Joaquín Ruiz-Giménez as censor was put into question. These areas (including the DGCT) were thus transferred to the newly-born Ministry of Information and Tourism, led by Gabriel Arias Salgado.

From 1962 onward—a period of purported "openness" during the second spell at the helm of the DGCT of José María García Escudero—the DGCT promoted and sponsored what it came to be known as "New Spanish Cinema", even though filmmakers were not fully exempt from censorship.

The DGCT disappeared in late 1967, when it was demoted to the rank of under-directorate reportedly because of budget cuts and was subsumed within the new Directorate General of Popular Culture and Spectacles, led by Carlos Robles Piquer.

== Bibliography ==
- Cal, Rosa (1999). "Apuntes sobre la actividad de la Dirección General de Propaganda del Franquismo (1945-1951)". Historia y Comunicación Social (4). Madrid: Ediciones Complutense: 15. ISSN 1137-0734.
- Cancio Fernández, Raúl C. (2009). "La acción administrativa sobre el hecho cinematográfico durante el franquismo" (PDF). Revista de Derecho UNED (5). Madrid: Universidad Nacional de Educación a Distancia: 149–183. ISSN 1886-9912.
- León Aguinaga, Pablo (2010). Sospechosos habituales. El cine norteamericano, Estados Unidos y la España. Madrid: consejo Superior de Investigaciones Científicas. ISBN 978-84-00-09079-1.
- Merino, Raquel; Rabadán, Rosa (2002). "Censored Translations in Franco's Spain: The TRACE Project —Theatre and Fiction (English-Spanish)". Censure et traduction dans le monde occidental. 15 (2). Association canadienne de traductologie: 125–152. doi:10.7202/007481ar. hdl:10810/43921. ISSN 0835-8443.
