= Filmoteca de Galica =

Film archive in Galicia, Spain

The Filmoteca de Galicia is a film archive in A Coruña, Spain. It was created in 1989 under the name Centro Galego de Artes da Imaxe.

== See also ==
- List of film archives
