= Fantaterror =

Fantaterror is a term for Spanish fantasy and horror cinema, particularly films produced in the 1960s and 1970s. The term combines the Spanish words fantástico ("fantastic") and terror ("horror"). The term has also been used more broadly to refer to Spanish supernatural cinema.

Considered a genuine Spanish cinematographic tradition and identity it did not obtain, in general, a positive reception from contemporary critics. However, several of its directors such as Jesús Franco, Narciso Ibáñez Serrador, Paul Naschy, Antonio Gracia José (Pierrot), León Klimovsky and Amando de Ossorio achieved national and international commercial success and some of the titles are considered cult films.

Film scholar Antonio Lázaro-Reboll examines the Spanish horror boom of 1968–1975 in his 2012 study Spanish Horror Film. His analysis challenges interpretations of the period's films as merely imitative of foreign horror cinema, emphasizing the diversity of their production contexts and the importance of contemporary critical reception.
