= Damaris Gelabert =

Spanish singer (born 1965)

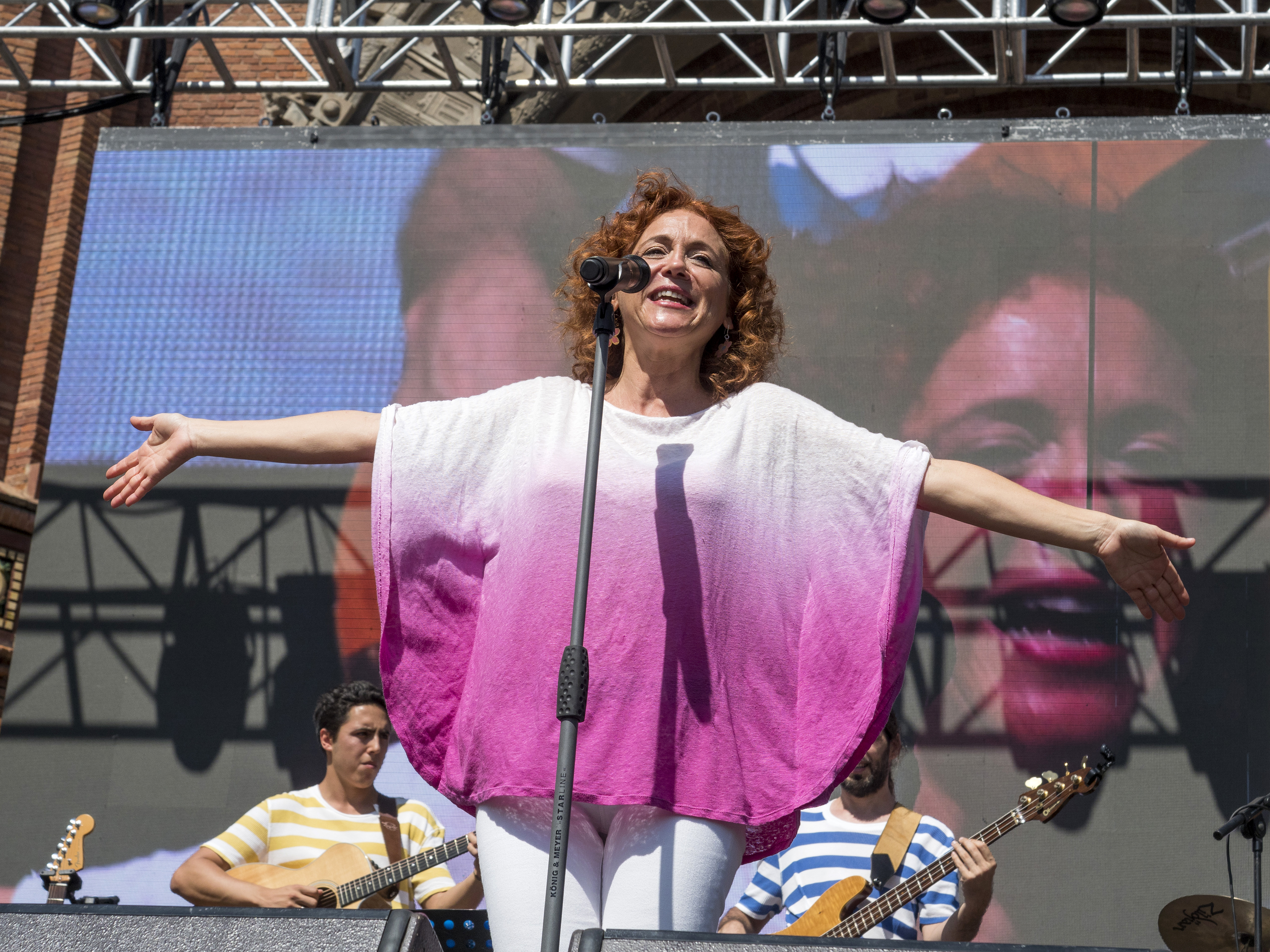
- Damaris Gelabert in 2018

Background information
- Born: 28 December 1965 (age 60); Barcelona, Spain
- Genres: Children's music
- Years active: 1998-present
- Website: www.damarisgelabert.com
- Education: University of Barcelona

Dàmaris Gelabert (born 28 December 1965) is a Spanish pedagogue, music therapist, author and singer of children's songs who primarily works in the Catalan language. Since 1998, she has released sixteen albums and over 200 songs. Her YouTube channel has over 800 million views with over 2 million subscribers. It is the most viewed Catalan YouTube channel and became the first Catalan music channel to receive the YouTube Silver Button.

== Biography ==
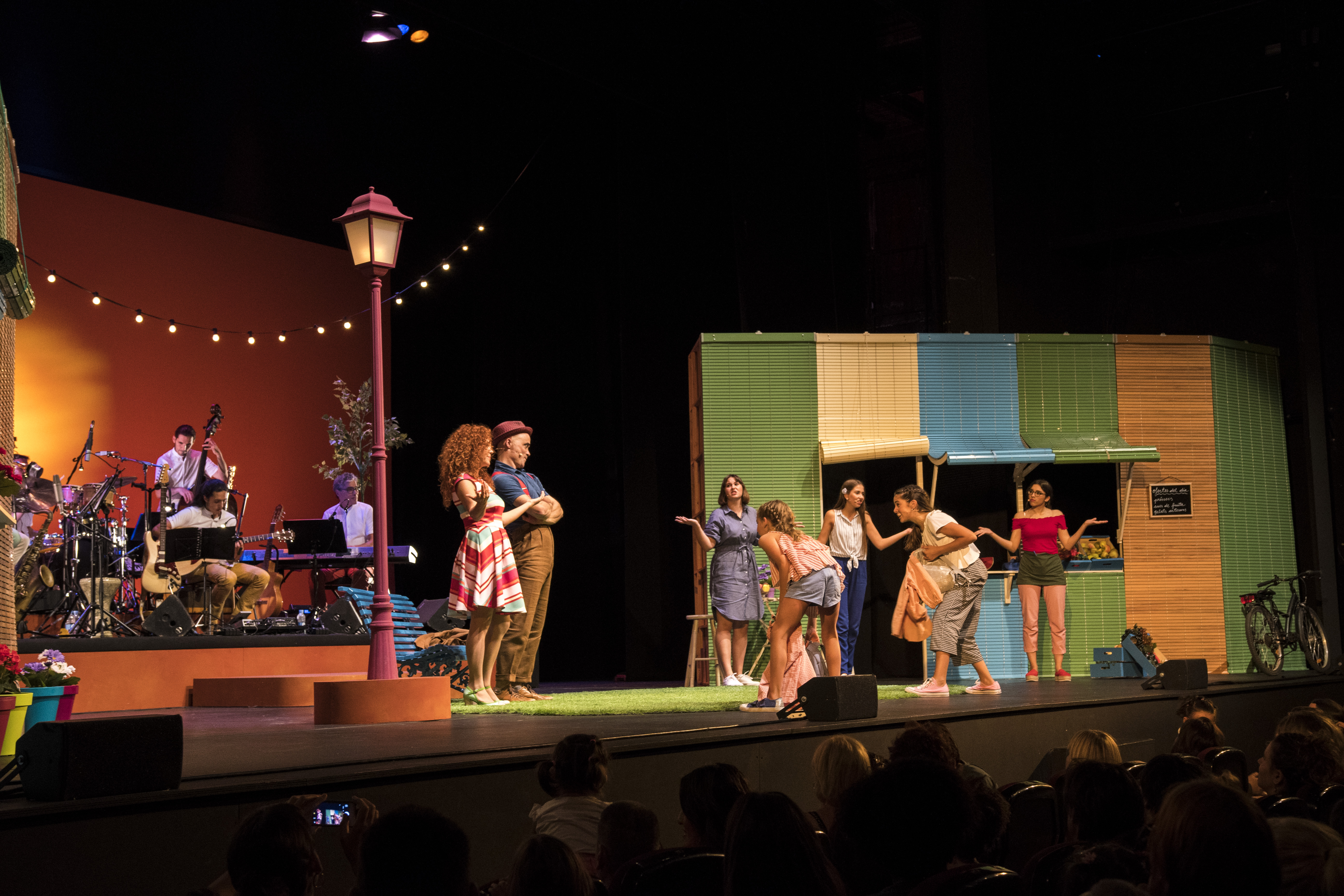
Show Summer Begins at the Victoria Theatre, June 2017

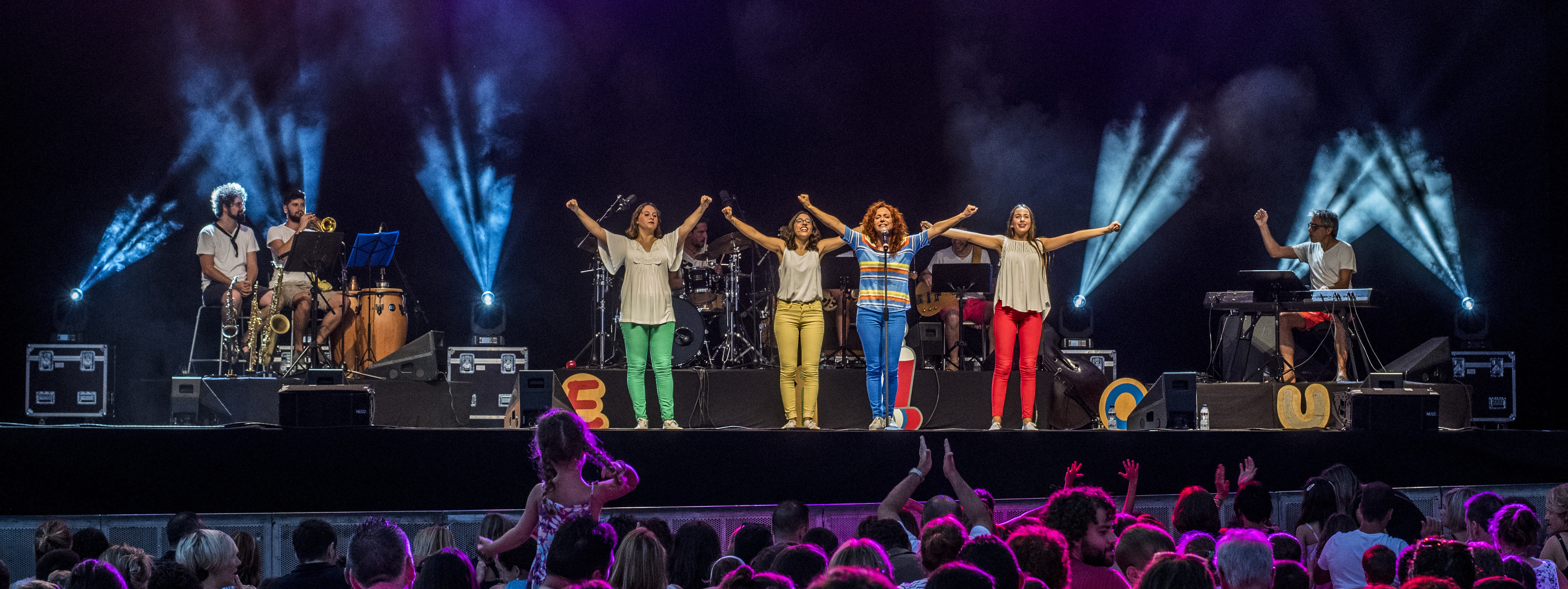
Concert at the Porta Ferrada Festival in 2017

Gelabert received her Philosophy and Educational Sciences degree from the University of Barcelona in June 1992, later specialising in music therapy. In 1995, she graduated from the Berklee College of Music in Boston, Massachusetts.

After returning from the US, she founded Totsona Records with musician Àlex Martínez, producing 200 songs and 16 albums.

Gelabert created a musical stimulation method for the 0 to 6-year-old stage called Totsona. This educational strategy is based on teaching music as the child's first language. She is a trainer and advisor for this program at different early childhood education and special education schools in Catalonia. In 2012 she inaugurated the Totsona Space located in Cardedeu, Barcelona, where the Totsona offices are located and where she teaches courses for teachers, educators and all those interested in the world of music and early childhood.

Gelabert teaches music therapy as a professor at ESMUC. She conducts lectures, courses, and seminars at various educational institutions, integrating teaching with concerts, auditions, and shows for children, families, and schools. She has sung in many festivals including the Festival de la Porta Ferrada, l'Acustiqueta, el Bornet de cançons, el Festivalot, the Cap Roig Festival and in theaters such as El Teatre Kursaal de Manresa, l' Atlàntida de Vic, l'Àtrium de Viladecans, Teatre-Auditori Sant Cugat, the Teatre Victòria, l'Alcúdia de Palma and l'Auditori Nacional d'Ordino. In 2018, she won the Arc Award in the category of “Best Artist Tour Adapted to Family Audiences”.

Within her YouTube channel, several popular videos include Els mosquits, with more than 300 million views, Els dies de la setmana, which has over 200 million, and Les vocals, Bon dia and Qui sóc jo?.

In 2023, Gelabert announced that she would end her live performances with La gira dels 25, along with the band "Grow Up Singing" and pianist Àlex Martínez. Her last concert was in January 2024 in Menorca.

== Discography ==
Damaris Gelabert has the following discography:

- Tot sona! (1998)
- Cançons per aprendre: 0-3 anys vol. I (2001)
- Cançons per aprendre: 3-7 anys vol. I (2001)
- Cançons per aprendre: 7-9 anys vol. I (2001)
- Emocions i sentiments: contes i cançons (2003)
- Cançons populars & noves (2004)
- Cançons de bressol (2004)
- Cançons per aprendre: 0-3 anys vol. II (2006)
- Cançons per aprendre: 3-7 anys vol. II (2006)
- Cançons per aprendre: personatges singulars (2007)
- M'agrada el Nadal (2008)
- Massatge amb cançons (2011)
- Jocs de falda – d'ara i de sempre (2014), nominated for the Enderrock Awards in the category of best album for family and children's audiences of 2014
- Comença l'estiu (2017)
- Naturalment (2018), nominated for the Enderrock Awards in the category of best album for family and children's audiences of 2018.
- És l'hora del jazz (2018)
- La festa de la pau (2019)
- És l'hora de l'orquestra (2019), finalist in the Enderrock Awards in the category of best album for family audiences of 2020.
- Mou el cos (2020)
- Soc feliç (2021)
- Bye Bye Monstre! (2021)
- Aplaudiments! (2024)

=== Custom songs ===
- Bona nit: les meves cançons de bressol
- Les meves cançons
- Feliç aniversari

=== DVDs ===
- Canta! (2013)
- Canta! Vol. II (2016)
