= Fructuós Gelabert =

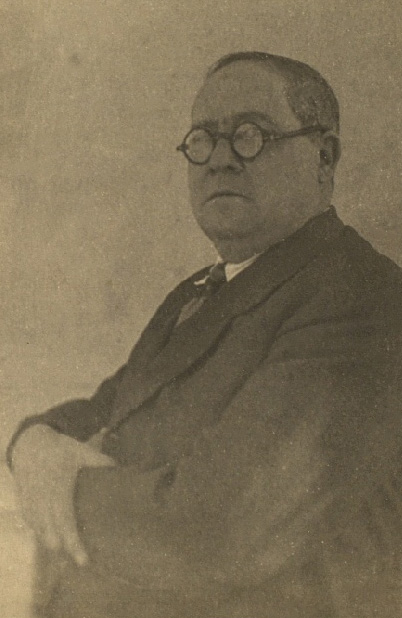
Fructuós Gelabert

Fructuós Gelabert Badiella (1874–1955) was a Catalan inventor and screenwriter. He was also a film director, directing over 100 films.

== Early life ==
Gelabert was born in Gràcia, then an independent municipality near Barcelona, into a craftsman family. His father’s work in woodworking and his own mechanical aptitude contributed to his later interest in filmmaking and invention. After encountering Edison’s kinetoscope in 1895 and the Lumière brothers' cinematograph in 1896, Gelabert was inspired to begin working in cinema.

== Career ==
In 1897, Gelabert produced his first films, including "Salida de los trabajadores de la fábrica "La España Industrial" and "Salida del público de la iglesia parroquial de Santa María de Sants". That same year, he directed "Riña en un café", which is often recognized as the first narrative film produced in Spain.

Gelabert gained international attention with a documentary depicting King Alfonso XIII’s visit to Barcelona in 1898, which was sold to the French company Pathé marking Spain’s first film sold abroad. He also experimented with special effects in works such as "Choque de Transatlánticos" (1899) and developed technological innovations, including a projection lamp that enhanced image brightness.

In 1908, he established one of Barcelona’s first film studios. His 1910 historical drama "Guzmán el Bueno" was notable for its use of three-dimensional sets and achieved critical success.

After 1915, Gelabert’s career declined due to increasing competition in the film industry and personal financial struggles. He transitioned to technical roles and occasional collaborations with other filmmakers. He briefly returned to directing with "La Puntaire" (1928), but the rise of sound films rendered it commercially unsuccessful.

In his later years, Gelabert focused on inventions and continued to explore ideas for filmmaking, including early concepts for 3D cinema. Despite his contributions to Spanish cinema, he lived in poverty during his final years. A tribute to his work was organized in 1952, but broader recognition of his influence came posthumously.

Gelabert died on 27 February 1956 in Sants, Barcelona. His surviving works are preserved at the Filmoteca de Catalunya, and he is regarded as one of the foundational figures in Spanish cinema. Streets in Barcelona and other locations have been named in his honor.
