= Fernando Díaz de Mendoza y Aguado =

Fernando Díaz de Mendoza
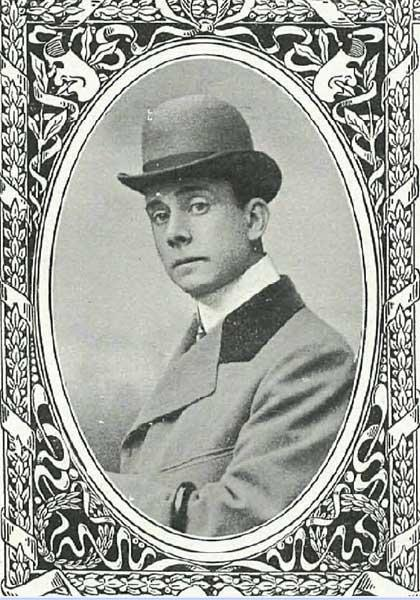
- Díaz de Mendoza as a young man
- Born: Fernando Díaz de Mendoza y Aguado; 7 June 1862; Jumilla, Murcia, Spain
- Died: 20 October 1930 (aged 68); Vigo, Pontevedra, Spain
- Spouse(s): 1. Ventura Serrano Domínguez; (1866–1890); 2. María Guerrero Torija (1867–1928)
- Children: Fernando Díaz de Mendoza Serrano (1889–1937); Fernando Díaz de Mendoza y Guerrero (1897–1942); Carlos Díaz de Mendoza (1898–1960)

Fernando Díaz de Mendoza y Aguado (7 June 1862 – 20 October 1930) was a Spanish actor, impresario and theatre director. According to some critics, he was one of the 20th century's best actors.

== Life ==
=== Early years ===
Fernando Díaz de Mendoza y Aguado was born in Jumilla (Note: Some contemporary historians record that he might have been born not in Jumilla but in Caravaca de la Cruz, a short distance to the west.) in the southeast of Spain. He was of aristocratic provenance. He had as titles 7th Marquis de San Mamés, 6th Marquis de Fontanar, Count of Balazote, Count of Lalaing and was a Grandee of Spain. His father was Mariano Díaz de Mendoza y Uribe, 5th Marquis de Fontanar, Grande de España and his mother Concepción Aguado y Flores. Little is known of his early years: during his adolescence he was a member of the society set in Murcia, known to friends as Fernando Fontanar, a reference to one of the several aristocratic titles he would later inherit from his father. As a young man he engaged in the pursuits appropriate to his wealth and status, involving hunting, partying and gambling.

=== Madrid ===
In 1880 he relocated to Madrid where he was able to network with other members of Spain's aristocrat elite. Events took an unexpected turn after 1885 when Antonia Domínguez y Borrell, the newly widowed Duchess of La Torre, decided to build a theatre to provide a creative distraction for the aristocratic set. The theatre would be named after her daughter, Ventura. It was constructed in a palatial property that the duchess owned in Madrid's Calle Villanueva (street). The theatre opened on 30 January 1887 and quickly became a social, cultural and political focus for Madrid society. The play presented was "El loco de la Guardilla" by Narciso Serra, with music by Manuel Fernández Caballero. The lead role of Cervantes was taken by a young actor called Fernando Diaz de Mendoza, who received for his performance the first of many standing ovations.

During the 1887 season, Diaz de Mendoza achieved popular stardom and enthusiastic plaudits from influential critics such as the writer Emilia Pardo Bazán and the politician Emilio Castelar. At the end of that season, Díaz de Mendoza and the young widow who owned the theatre announced their marriage. His wife was the daughter of the recently deceased Duke of Torre and the couple were unusually rich.

Fernando Díaz de Mendoza himself was widowed in 1890, shortly after the birth of the couple's first child, Fernando Díaz de Mendoza Serrano (1889–1937). During the next couple of years he managed to spend his formidable fortune, and in 1892, for the first time in his life, he found himself obliged to work for his living. During 1892 he appeared in several Madrid theatres, then joining the theatre company of Wenceslao Bueno with which he toured in the provinces. However, the company was dissolved in 1893 leaving Díaz de Mendoza without work. That year he was offered a position by Ramón Guerrero with the Spanish Theatre (Teatro Español) in Madrid, an institution under the control of the municipality.

=== Relaunch ===
The Spanish Theatre was undergoing building work at the time, so Díaz de Mendoza's debut with the Spanish Theatre company took place in Madrid's Teatro Princesa (as the Teatro María Guerrero was known at that time). (Note: Madrid's Teatro Princesa should not be confused with the better remembered Teatro Princesa in Valencia.) where towards the end of 1893 he appeared in ""El desdén, con el desdén! by Agustín Moreto. In January 1894 he went on to appear in the comedy "Mariana" by José Echegaray. Back home, readers of El Diario de Murcia would have found the newspaper's Madrid correspondent eulogistic on the subject Díaz de Mendoza's theatre performances in the capital. In October 1894 he starred opposite María Guerrero in the classic El vergonzoso en palacio by the priest-dramatist Tirso de Molina. His co-star was the daughter of Ramón Guerrero who had given him his contract with the Spanish Theatre: the stage partnership on which the two of them embarked in 1894 became a more substantial matter in 1896 when they married. Around this time Fernando Díaz de Mendoza became lead actor, director and impresario of Madrid's Spanish Theatre.

In 1896, Fernando Díaz de Mendoza and his new wife María Guerrero formed their own theatrical company. On 11 April 1897 their time with the Spanish Theatre came to an end, and four days later they embarked from Barcelona for their first tour in South America, with plans to stage 90 productions in Montevideo and Buenos Aires. The contract they had signed with an American production company stipulated that they should receive 65% of takings provided total daily takings were at least 2,000 pesetas. Argentine press reports indicated that the Spanish company arrived preceded by an excellent reputation. Nevertheless, local audiences were reputed to be very demanding and during recent years several European theatre productions had failed in the region.

=== South American success ===
The most important tour venue was the Odeón Theatre in Buenos Aires, where there were 16 performances, including El desdén, con el desdén and El vergonzoso en palacio (Agustín Moreto) along with La niña boba from the classical repertoire and contemporary pieces such as Mancha que limpia (José Echegaray), Lo positivo and Los Dolores. Audiences were enthusiastic. Positive critical press reports in Argentina were summarised back in Spain by the culturally focused weekly journal La Ilustración Artística which reported the tour as "one of the greatest theatrical successes the Argentine capital has ever experienced".

The Guerrero-Díaz de Mendoz company met with similar triumph in Montevideo. The first South American tour was a critical success which paved the way for further tours which would provide opportunities to perform in countries including Peru, Colombia, Bolivia and Cuba.

=== European career ===
During a 1902 tour Díaz de Mendoza was involved in a sad episode in Cuba, when another major Spanish actor, Antonio Vico y Pintos, on tour at the time in Cuba, died in Nuevitas. Díaz de Mendoza made arrangements to take the body back to Spain with him, and paid all the necessary costs. Unfortunately the repatriation was blocked at the time and Vico had to be buried in Cuba. Five years later, however, thanks to the persistence of Díaz de Mendoza, his fellow thespian's remains were exhumed and returned for burial to Madrid in 1907.

Success of their tours in Spanish speaking parts of South America persuaded the couple to tour their productions in several European countries. Their Paris premier was a production at the Théâtre de la Renaissance of La niña boba on 4 October 1900. Later that year they moved on to give productions to Italy and Belgium and were well received by critics. However, commitments in Spain and South America ruled out any more major European tours in subsequent years, although they gave several performances in Portugal during the early years of the twentieth century.

Official recognition came in March 1903 when Díaz de Mendoza, seen by many critics as the greatest actor of the age, was appointed by Royal Command to a professorship at Madrid's Conservatory of Music and Drama, where he was given the Chair in Declamation. In 1904 the couple moved into a luxurious three-storey mansion, designed by María Guerrero, with construction managed by an architect called Pablo Aranda. The cost was reported as one million reales. An unusual aspect of the new home was that it contained in the basement garage three of the first motor cars in Madrid: a Renault, a Charron 75 and an electric Columbia. The running the house involved a team of 14 servants, working under the supervision of a governess called "Miss Hughes".

In 1908 the municipality terminated the Guerrero-Díaz de Mendoz company's contract for the operation of the Spanish Theatre, complaining that the company's South American tours were making it impossible for them to fulfill their contractual duties in respect of Madrid. In October 1908 Díaz de Mendoza also found himself required to resign his professorship Conservatory of Music and Drama where, again, the complaint was that he had been insufficiently present.

By this time he also had a major new project in Madrid where on 20 March 1908 Fernando Díaz de Mendoza purchased the Teatro Princesa (subsequently renamed as the Theatre of María GuerreroTeatro María Guerrero). Following various changes the Guerrero-Díaz de Mendoza company gave their inaugural production at the theatre on 27 November 1909 with an interpretation of María la Brava. The couple also moved out of their palatial home, taking up residence in a building annexed to their newly acquired theatre, with a direct passageway to the theatre stage. They retained ownership of the theatre till Maria's death in 1928, when it was purchased by the state. Since 1978 it has been home to Spain's National Drama Centre.

During the 1910s and 1920s the company continued with its successful productions in Spain and in Latin America. Such was their fame, that often venues had to wait for several years before they had the opportunity to welcome a visit from the Díaz de Mendoza theatre company. In Argentina they founded the National Cervantes Theatre in 1921. Díaz de Mendoza also became known as one of the best stage directors of his day. In his old age he was placed in charge at the Madrid Royal Conservatory.

== Personal ==
Fernando Diaz de Mendoza y Serrano's three legitimate sons all became actors.

He fathered a fourth son with the successful Cuban born actress Catalina Bárcena. Bárcena hurriedly married and the boy grew up with his natural father's first name and his step father's surname as Fernando Vargas.

His artistic family appears in the dictionary work on Spanish artistic sagas. Teatralerias, tres siglos de la escena, (2018) Madrid: P & V, ISBN 9781724872289
