= Antonio Vico y Pintos =

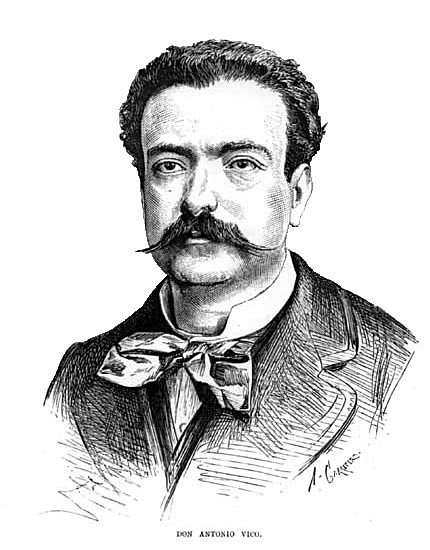
Antonio Vico Pinto 1875

Antonio Vico Pinto (3 December 1840 - 8 March 1940) was a Spanish stage actor.

== Family provenance ==
Antonio Vico Pinto was born into a family of thespians at Jerez de la Frontera in the extreme southwest of Spain. His father was the actor Antonio Vico y López de Adrián. In 2015 his descendants continue to contribute actively to the world of theatre in Spain.

An early mentor was the actor José Valero, from whom he learned some of the "heartthrob" roles, until 1864 which was when Antonio Vico switched to the Victorino Tamayo theatre company. It was another nine years before he attracted attention with his interpretation of "Los amantes de Teruel" at the Teatro Lope de Rueda (as it was then known) in Madrid. Shortly after this he formed a theatre company with Rafael Calvo Revilla, with whom from now on he maintained an intermittent but fruitful working friendship.

Calvo and Vico played key roles in the revival of the theatre in Madrid, supported by the friendship of dramatists such as Galdós, Echegaray, Cano and Sellés. Another admirer was a youthful Antonio Machado. During this period Vico starred in productions of "En el puño de la espada", "La muerte en los labios", "Cid Rodrigo de Vivar", "La Pasionaria", "Otelo", "Vida alegre y muerte triste" and, again in association with Calvo, El gran Galeoto.

From 1882 Vico taught at the Royal Academy of Dramatic Arts in Madrid. His autobiography, replete with numerous personal theatrical anecdotes, was published in 1902.

Antonio Vico died at Nuevitas during a theatre tour in Latin America and his body was buried locally. Later, however, his remains were returned to Spain for burial at the Cementerio de San Justo at Madrid.
