= Theatre of María Guerrero =

- Teatro María Guerrero (Spanish)
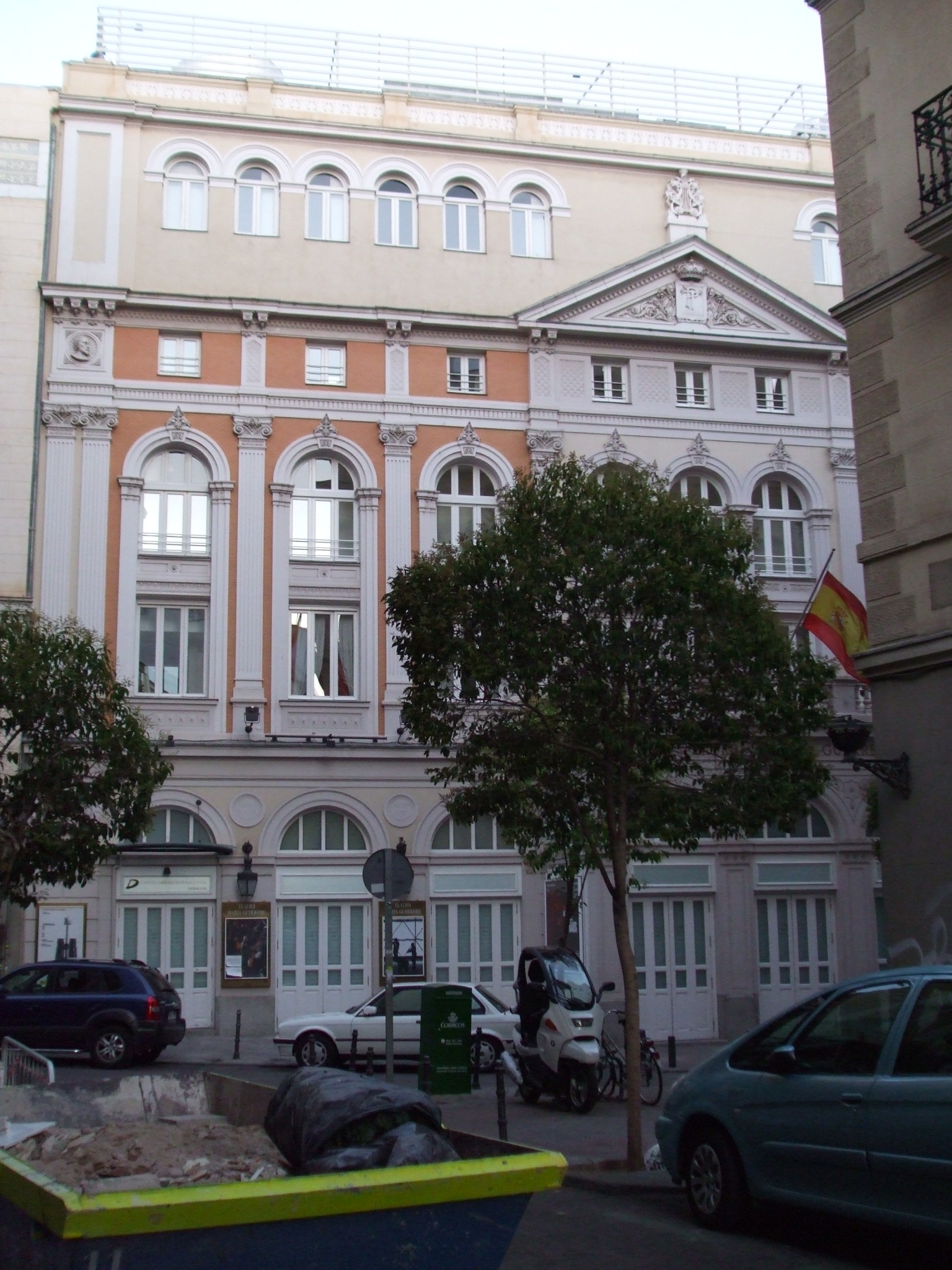

- Location within Spain
- 40.422915°N 3.693006°W
- Location: Madrid, Spain

History
- Built: 1884-1885

Spanish Cultural Heritage
- Official name: Teatro María Guerrero
- Type: Non-movable
- Criteria: Monument
- Designated: 1996
- Reference no.: RI-51-0009160

The Theatre of María Guerrero (Spanish: Teatro María Guerrero) is a theatre located in Madrid, Spain. It was declared Bien de Interés Cultural on 1 March 1996. It is the home of the national theatre of Spain, Centro Dramático Nacional.

Its plays was programmed on 15 January 1934 until 1935, when it was remodeled. It was closed on 27 April 1940 because Spanish Civil War started. It was directed successively by Luis Escobar Kirkpatrick (with Huberto Pérez de la Ossa as subdirector) (1940-1952), Claudio de la Torre (1952-1960) and José Luis Alonso Mañés (1960-1975).
