= María Guerrero =

Spanish actor and director

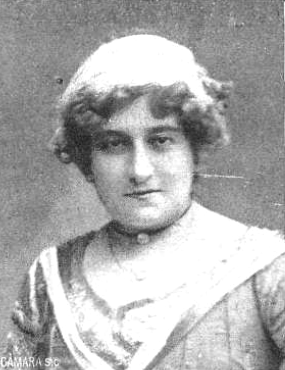
- Guerrero in 1912
- Born: María Ana de Jesús Guerrero Torija; April 17, 1867; Madrid, Spain
- Died: 23 January 1928 (aged 60); Madrid, Spain
- Occupation: Actress
- Spouse: Fernando Díaz de Mendoza

María Ana de Jesús Guerrero Torija (April 17, 1867 - January 23, 1928), better known as María Guerrero, was a prominent Spanish theatre actress, producer and director.

== Life and work ==
María Guerrero Torija was born in Madrid in 1867. She enrolled at the Official School of Declamation, in the prestigious Madrid Royal Conservatory, where she was trained in the theatre with dramatist Teodora Lamadrid. Guerrero debuted in 1885 and later performed for José de Echegaray, one of the principal figures in the Culture of Spain, at the time. She later performed for French dramatist Benoît-Constant Coquelin, and with Sarah Bernhardt.

She married Fernando Díaz de Mendoza, the Marquess of San Mamés, in 1896, and the following year, the couple relocated to Buenos Aires, Argentina. A commercial success at the local Teatro Odeón, her productions of zarzuelas and adaptations of classics in Spanish literature (particularly Lope de Vega's) took her company to theatres nationwide. Retaining contractual obligations in Spain, the couple purchased Madrid's Teatro de la Princesa in 1908. The couple also set aside a share of their fortune in 1918 for the construction of a new, grand theatre house in Buenos Aires. The project caught the attention of both local high society and the King of Spain, Alfonso XIII, who collaborated with its construction by commissioning artisanal material for the theatre, named in honor of Spain's legendary novelist and dramatist, Miguel de Cervantes.

The Cervantes Theatre was inaugurated in 1921 with a production of Lope de Vega's La dama boba (The Foolish Lady). The proliferation of theatres in Buenos Aires and the advent of the radio in Argentina soon eroded the Cervantes' audience base, however, and in 1926, the couple was forced to auction the institution, which was purchased by the Argentine government. They then returned to Madrid, where Guerrero died in 1928, at the age of 60.

The Teatro de la Princesa was purchased by the Spanish government following her death and in 1931, it was renamed the Teatro María Guerrero. Among her grandchildren were the well-known Spanish actor, Fernando Fernán Gómez.
