= List of highest-grossing films in Spain =

This list charts the most successful films at cinemas in Spain by box office sales, in euros and admissions. It also lists the most popular Spanish productions.

== Highest-grossing films ==
The following are the highest-grossing films in Spain.

Rank	Title	Year	Gross (€m)
1	Avatar	2009	79.4
2	Spanish Affair	2014	56.2
3	Avatar: The Way of Water	2022	51.0
4	Inside Out 2	2024	45.5
5	Titanic	1998	42.7
6	The Impossible	2012	42.4
7	Spider-Man: Brand New Day	2026	40.3
8	La bola negra	2026	39.7
9	The Lion King	2019	37.2
10	Spanish Affair 2	2015	36.1

=== Highest-grossing Spanish films ===
The ten highest-grossing Spanish films of all time by domestic box office gross revenue are listed as follows:

Highest-grossing Spanish films of all time in Spain
Rank	Title	Year	Domestic gross (million €)
1	Spanish Affair	2014	56.2
2	The Impossible	2012	42.4
3	La bola negra	2026	39.7
4	Spanish Affair 2	2015	36.1
5	Torrente for President	2026	28.1
6	The Others	2001	27.3
7	A Monster Calls	2016	26.5
8	The Orphanage	2007	25.1
9	Mortadelo & Filemon: The Big Adventure	2003	22.8
10	Torrente 2: Mission in Marbella	2001	22.1

=== Highest-grossing Spanish films worldwide ===
The highest-grossing Spanish films of all time by worldwide box office gross revenue are listed as follows:

Highest-grossing Spanish films of all time worldwide
Rank	Title	Year	Language	Director	Gross (million $)	Ref
1	Fast & Furious 6	2013	English	Justin Lin	788.7	
2	The Others	2001	English	Alejandro Amenábar	209.9	
3	The Impossible	2012	English/Spanish	J. A. Bayona	198.1	
4	Midnight in Paris	2006	English	Woody Allen	151.7	
5	Mama	2013	English	Andy Muschietti	146.4	
6	Perfume: The Story of a Murderer	2006	English	Tom Tykwer	135.0	
7	Vicky Cristina Barcelona	2008	English/Spanish	Woody Allen	96.4	
8	Volver	2006	Spanish	Pedro Almodóvar	85.6	
9	Spanish Affair	2014	Spanish	Emilio Martínez-Lázaro	78.7	
10	The Orphanage	2007	Spanish	J. A. Bayona	78.6	

== Progression of highest-grossing film ==
Below is the list of films that were listed in the annual yearbooks as having the highest gross since 1965. The gross reported is that by the end of the year the record was subsequently broken. The film may have continued to gross more in later years. Variety reported a gross of 577.6 million Pesetas ($3.4 million) for Gone With the Wind in 1986. The official gross since 1965 at that date was 455.9 million Pesetas, which suggests a gross of 121.7 million Pesetas prior to 1965.

Title	Year of record	Gross (₧)	Ref
Doctor Zhivago	1966	203,645,611	
The Godfather	1974	223,416,080	
The Towering Inferno	1975	280,996,150	
Jaws	1976	436,893,775	
Star Wars	1978	542,047,776	
Superman	1979	696,935,714	
E.T. the Extra-Terrestrial	1983	1,810,278,534	
Basic Instinct	1992	2,203,132,927	
Jurassic Park	1993	2,922,217,164	
The Lion King	1995	3,087,503,868	
Titanic	1998	6,332,537,226	

Title	Year of record	Gross (€)	Ref
Avatar	2010	74,528,952	
Avatar (including Avatar: Special Edition)	2010	76,982,912	

=== Progression of highest-grossing Spanish film ===
Title	Year of record	Gross (₧)	Ref
La ciudad no es para mí	1966	71,096,671	
La Residencia	1971	83,026,348	
No desearás al vecino del quinto	1971	118,374,888	
Furtivos (Note: El amor del capitán Brando released in 1974 grossed 122.4 million pesetas by the end of 1975 and may have set the record before Furtivos which grossed 130 million by the end of the year)	1975	251,594,053	
La guerra de papá	1978	356,531,484	
El crimen de Cuenca	1982	458,147,877	
Los santos inocentes	1984	523,745,360	
La vaquilla	1987	526,322,389	
Women on the Verge of a Nervous Breakdown	1988	1,164,784,419	
Airbag	1998	1,198,425,511	
Torrente, the Dumb Arm of the Law	1998	1,811,710,690	

Title	Year of record	Gross (€)	Ref
Torrente 2: Mission in Marbella	2001	22,050,842	
The Others	2001	27,254,163	
The Impossible	2012	42,408,164	
Spanish Affair	2014	55,379,948	

== Most admissions ==
The following are the films with the most cinema admissions in Spain since 1965 as at the end of 2023. (Note: It was not made mandatory to officially communicate the number of tickets sold until 1 January 1965. Before that, box office grosses were a secret kept by exhibitors for tax reasons. The only guide to estimate them was the length of the first-run and the capacity of the venue.)

Rank	Title	Year	Admissions
1	Titanic	1998	11,417,167
2	Avatar	2009	9,489,978
3	Spanish Affair	2014	9,397,647
4	E.T. the Extra-Terrestrial	1982	7,728,164
5	Doctor Zhivago	1966	7,258,351
6	The Lord of the Rings: The Fellowship of the Ring	2001	7,153,941
7	The Lord of the Rings: The Return of the King	2003	6,929,263
8	Star Wars	1977/1997	6,901,869
9	The Sixth Sense	1999	6,762,590
10	Avatar: The Way of Water	2022	6,737,482

=== Most admissions for Spanish productions ===
The following are the Spanish films with the most cinema admissions in Spain since 1965 as at the end of 2023.

Rank	Title	Year	Admissions
1	Spanish Affair	2014	9,397,647
2	The Others	2001	6,410,785
3	The Impossible	2012	6,129,976
4	La bola negra	2026	5,873,200
5	Spanish Affair 2	2015	5,693,198
6	For A Few Dollars More	1966	5,521,025
7	Torrente 2: Mission in Marbella	2001	5,321,969
8	Mortadelo & Filemon: The Big Adventure	2003	4,985,983
9	A Monster Calls	2016	4,613,696
10	The Orphanage	2007	4,420,987

== Progression of most admissions ==
Below is the list of films that were listed in the annual yearbooks as having the most admissions since 1965. The admissions reported below are those by the end of the year the record was set. The film may have had further admissions in future years. Until 1981, Peliculas varias (English: Various movies) was listed as the film with the most admissions with over 7 million. It was again listed at the top in 1990. The first yearbook with this data was 1975 which listed El Padrecito as second after Peliculas varias however, in the 1976 yearbook, Doctor Zhivago, which was missing from the 1975 list, was listed above El Padrecito and its admissions for 1976 suggest that it had more admissions as at the end of 1975.

Title	Year of record	Admissions	Ref
Doctor Zhivago	1975	6,070,003	
El Padrecito	1980	6,181,018	
E.T. the Extra-Terrestrial	1983	6,875,209	
Titanic	1998	10,653,520	

=== Progression of most admissions for Spanish films ===
Title	Year of record	Admissions	Ref
La ciudad no es para mí	1966	4,280,409	
For a Few Dollars More	1978	4,422,378	
The Others	2001	6,242,330	
Spanish Affair	2014	9,346,292	

== Most popular film by year ==
This lists the highest-grossing films in Spain per year based on their gross for the calendar year as per the data published annually by the Spanish Ministry of Culture. The highest-grossing Spanish productions are listed separately.

Year	Title (all productions)	Gross (₧ million)	Title (Spanish productions)	Gross (₧ million)	Ref
1968	The Professionals	42.5	No somos de piedra	35.7	
1969	Helga	83.5	They Came to Rob Las Vegas	36.7	
1970	La Residencia	65.9	La Residencia	65.9	
1971	Airport	84.4	No desearás al vecino del quinto	80.9	
1972	Fiddler on the Roof	105.1	Adiós, cigüeña, adiós	52.0	
1973	Cabaret	125.8	Experiencia prematrimonial	66.3	
1974	The Sting	148.5	Tormento	75.0	
1975	The Towering Inferno	248.9	Furtivos	130.0	
1976	A Clockwork Orange	288.1	La trastienda	156.6	
1977	Rocky	252.5	Asignatura pendiente	193.0	
1978	Emmanuelle	361.8	La guerra de papá	151.1	
1979	Superman	655.3	Los bingueros	105.0	
1980	Kramer vs. Kramer	410.6	...y al tercer año, resucitó	174.1	
1981	El crimen de Cuenca	367.7	El crimen de Cuenca	367.7	
1982	On Golden Pond	332.6	La colmena	236.4	
1983	E.T. the Extra-Terrestrial	1,388.6	El pico	156.2	
1984	Gremlins	705.3	Los santos inocentes	466.6	
1985	Rambo: First Blood Part II	820.6	La vaquilla	505.1	
1986	Out of Africa	872.1	Sé infiel y no mires con quién	221.1	
1987	Platoon	678.2	El Lute: camina o revienta	354.7	
1988	The Last Emperor	885.1	Women on the Verge of a Nervous Breakdown	644.7	
1989	Indiana Jones and the Last Crusade	1,458.8	Women on the Verge of a Nervous Breakdown	330.1	
1990	Pretty Woman	1,209.7	Aquí huele a muerto	482.7	
1991	Dances with Wolves	1,324.1	High Heels	729.9	
1992	Basic Instinct	2,161.5	1492: Conquest of Paradise	429.4	
1993	Jurassic Park	2,578.5	Belle Époque	626.0	
1994	The Lion King	1,970.2	Todos los hombres sois iguales	410.8	
1995	Pocahontas	1,298.6	Two Much	764.1	
1996	Independence Day	1,816.3	Two Much	369.0	
1997	The Lost World: Jurassic Park	1,860.3	Airbag	1,152.3	
1998	Titanic	6,215.3	Torrente, the Dumb Arm of the Law	1,706.2	
1999	Star Wars: Episode I – The Phantom Menace	3,796.4	All About My Mother	1,220.7	
2000	The Sixth Sense	4,406.0	La comunidad	969.4	

Year	Title (all productions)	Gross (€ million)	Title (Spanish productions)	Gross (€ million)	Ref
2001	The Others	26.6	The Others	26.6	
2002	Spider-Man	22.6	El otro lado de la cama	12.2	
2003	Mortadelo & Filemon: The Big Adventure	22.8	Mortadelo & Filemon: The Big Adventure	22.8	
2004	Shrek 2	28.8	The Sea Inside	19.4	
2005	Star Wars: Episode III – Revenge of the Sith	18.8	Torrente 3: el protector	18.2	
2006	Pirates of the Caribbean: Dead Man's Chest	27.9	Alatriste	16.5	
2007	The Orphanage	24.3	The Orphanage	24.3	
2008	Indiana Jones and the Kingdom of the Crystal Skull	20.9	The Oxford Murders	8.2	
2009	Up	24.6	Agora	20.4	
2010	Avatar	50.4	Tres metros sobre el cielo	8.5	
2011	Torrente 4: Lethal Crisis	19.3	Torrente 4: Lethal Crisis	19.3	
2012	The Impossible	41.0	The Impossible	41.0	
2013	The Croods	13.8	Fast & Furious 6	9.4	
2014	Spanish Affair	55.2	Spanish Affair	55.2	
2015	Spanish Affair 2	31.5	Spanish Affair 2	31.5	
2016	A Monster Calls	26.0	A Monster Calls	26.0	
2017	Beauty and the Beast	22.0	Tadeo Jones 2: El secreto del Rey Midas	17.6	
2018	Jurassic World: Fallen Kingdom	23.8	Campeones	18.8	
2019	The Lion King	34.4	Father There Is Only One	13.6	
2020	Father There Is Only One 2	10.6	Father There Is Only One 2	10.6	
2021	Spider-Man: No Way Home	18.4	¡A todo tren! Destino Asturias	8.1	
2022	Avatar: The Way of Water	24.4	Father There Is Only One 3	14.0	
2023	Barbie	33.4	Campeonex	11.7	
2024	Inside Out 2	45.5	Father There Is Only One 4	13.4	
2025	Lilo & Stitch	24.7	Father There Is Only One 5	13.4	
2026	Spider-Man: Brand New Day	40.3	La bola negra	39.7	

== See also ==
- Lists of highest-grossing films
