= List of 2024 box office number-one films in Spain =

The following is a list of 2024 box office number-one films in Spain by week.

== Number-one films ==
This is a list of films which are placed at number one at the weekend box office for the year 2024 in Spain.

†	This implies the highest-grossing movie of the year.

#	Date	Film	Gross	Admissions	Notes	Ref
1	January 7, 2024	Aquaman and the Lost Kingdom	€591,722	75,224	Aquaman and the Lost Kingdom reclaimed the number-one spot in its third weekend. However, Wonka had more admissions, 79,785.	
2	January 14, 2024	The Beekeeper	€632,800	84,480		
3	January 21, 2024	The Courier	€530,547	73,326	The Courier is the first Spanish film to reach number one in 2024.	
4	January 28, 2024	Poor Things	€798,082	107,705	A Moroccan Affair overcame Championext and became the highest-grossing Spanish film of 2023.	
5	February 4, 2024	Anyone but You	€808,167	107,726	Anyone but You reached the number-one spot on its third weekend.	
6	February 11, 2024	Anyone but You	€678,606	88,965		
7	February 18, 2024	Madame Web	€617,193	83,425		
8	February 25, 2024	Demon Slayer: Kimetsu no Yaiba – To the Hashira Training	€419,402	54,672	Demon Slayer: Kimetsu no Yaiba - To the Hashira Training has the lowest number-one opening weekend of 2024 in admissions so far.	
9	March 3, 2024	Dune: Part Two	€3,169,871	392,183	Dune: Part Two has the best opening of 2024 so far.	
10	March 10, 2024	Kung Fu Panda 4	€2,616,312	372,279		
11	March 17, 2024	Dune: Part Two	€1,297,976	160,072	Dune: Part Two reclaimed the number-one spot in its third weekend. However, Kung Fu Panda 4 had more admissions, 177,023.	
12	March 24, 2024	Ghostbusters: Frozen Empire	€1,175,324	162,178		
13	March 31, 2024	Godzilla x Kong: The New Empire	€1,903,252	242,707		
14	April 7, 2024	Godzilla x Kong: The New Empire	€743,017	99,095		
15	April 14, 2024	Checkmates	€416,701	60,342	Checkmates is the second Spanish film to reach number one in 2024. However, it has the lowest-grossing number-one opening of the year so far.	
16	April 21, 2024	Civil War	€541,525	71,676		
17	April 28, 2024	The Fall Guy	€904,099	118,211		
18	May 5, 2024	The Garfield Movie	€1,098,941	158,869		
19	May 12, 2024	Kingdom of the Planet of the Apes	€1,940,716	243,699		
20	May 19, 2024	Kingdom of the Planet of the Apes	€1,253,837	160,811		
21	May 26, 2024	Furiosa: A Mad Max Saga	€806,928	105,529		
22	June 2, 2024	Furiosa: A Mad Max Saga	€391,294	49,774	The second week of Furiosa: A Mad Max Saga has the lowest grosses and admissions for a number-one film in 2024. Moreover, IF has a higher number of admissions, 51,711.	
23	June 9, 2024	Bad Boys: Ride or Die	€1,623,925	213,846		
24	June 16, 2024	Bad Boys: Ride or Die	€891,896	114,804		
25	June 23, 2024	Inside Out 2 †	€6,702,473	918,295	The opening of Inside Out 2 has the highest-grossing number-one of 2024 so far. It is also the highest since Avatar: The Way of Water, the third after the COVID-10 pandemic and the best for an animated-film ever.	
26	June 30, 2024	Inside Out 2 †	€5,404,057	739,924		
27	July 7, 2024	Despicable Me 4	€3,102,156	435,941		
28	July 14, 2024	Despicable Me 4	€1,687,742	235,223		
29	July 21, 2024	Father There Is Only One 4	€2,080,298	304,188	Father There Is Only One 4 is the third Spanish film to reach the number-one spot in 2024. It is also the best Spanish film opening since Tad, the Lost Explorer and the Emerald Tablet in 2022. Inside Out 2 surpassed The Lion King (2019) and became the highest-grossing animated and Disney film ever.	
30	July 28, 2024	Deadpool & Wolverine	€4,576,611	588,354		
31	August 4, 2024	Deadpool & Wolverine	€2,650,397	332,593		
32	August 11, 2024	Deadpool & Wolverine	€1,372,712	170,184		
33	August 18, 2024	Alien: Romulus	€1,187,692	149,897		
34	August 25, 2024	I Hate Summer	€832,422	121,485	I Hate Summer is the fourth Spanish film to reach the number-one spot in 2024.	
35	September 1, 2024	I Hate Summer	€691,034	100,297		
36	September 8, 2024	Beetlejuice Beetlejuice	€2,201,251	298,492		
37	September 15, 2024	Beetlejuice Beetlejuice	€1,231,415	170,027		
38	September 22, 2024	Beetlejuice Beetlejuice	€922,012	127,990		
39	September 29, 2024	Beetlejuice Beetlejuice	€612,643	83,841		
40	October 6, 2024	Joker: Folie à Deux	€2,585,613	332,183		
41	October 13, 2024	The Wild Robot	€1,983,897	281,270		
42	October 20, 2024	The Wild Robot	€1,487,120	213,452		
43	October 27, 2024	Venom: The Last Dance	€2,345,603	314,432		
44	November 3, 2024	Venom: The Last Dance	€1,591,714	209,508		
45	November 10, 2024	Red One	€1,023,654	146,673		
46	November 17, 2024	Gladiator II	€5,772,730	767,372		
47	November 24, 2024	Gladiator II	€3,381,455	438,064		
48	December 1, 2024	Moana 2	€4,864,446	681,730		
49	December 8, 2024	Moana 2	€4,021,721	545,984		
50	December 15, 2024	Moana 2	€1,667,725	236,525		
51	December 22, 2024	Mufasa: The Lion King	€3,189,565	433,493		
52	December 29, 2024	Mufasa: The Lion King	€2,811,830	374,657		

== Highest-grossing films ==
=== In-year release ===
Highest-grossing films of 2024 by in-year release
Rank	Title	Distributor	Domestic gross
1	Inside Out 2	Walt Disney Studios Motion Pictures	€45,513,970
2	Deadpool & Wolverine	Walt Disney Studios Motion Pictures	€23,943,702
3	Gladiator II	Paramount Pictures	€20,939,702
4	Despicable Me 4	Universal Pictures	€20,730,885
5	Mufasa: The Lion King	Walt Disney Studios Motion Pictures	€20,549,957
6	Moana 2	Walt Disney Studios Motion Pictures	€20,081,539
7	Dune: Part Two	Warner Bros. Pictures	€13,856,505
8	Father There Is Only One 4	Sony Pictures	€13,442,979
9	The Wild Robot	Universal Pictures	€10,373,970
10	Kung Fu Panda 4	Universal Pictures	€9,744,919
11	Undercover	Beta Fiction	€9,614,700
12	It Ends With Us	Sony Pictures	€8,656,388
13	Sonic the Hedgehog 3	Paramount Pictures	€8,672,571
14	Beetlejuice Beetlejuice	Warner Bros. Pictures	€8,582,621
15	Venom: The Last Dance	Sony Pictures	€8,053,117

=== Calendar gross ===
Highest-grossing films of 2024 by calendar grosses
Rank	Title	Distributor	Domestic gross
1	Inside Out 2	Walt Disney Studios Motion Pictures	€45,513,970
2	Deadpool & Wolverine	Walt Disney Studios Motion Pictures	€23,943,702
3	Despicable Me 4	Universal Pictures	€20,730,885
4	Gladiator II	Paramount Pictures	€19,612,433
5	Moana 2	Walt Disney Studios Motion Pictures	€16,208,608
6	Dune: Part Two	Warner Bros. Pictures	€13,856,505
7	Father There Is Only One 4	Sony Pictures	€13,442,979
8	The Wild Robot	Universal Pictures	€10,373,970
9	Kung Fu Panda 4	Universal Pictures	€9,744,919
10	It Ends With Us	Sony Pictures	€8,656,388
11	Beetlejuice Beetlejuice	Warner Bros. Pictures	€8,582,621
12	Mufasa: The Lion King	Walt Disney Studios Motion Pictures	€8,503,565
13	Undercover	Beta Fiction	€8,108,000
14	Venom: The Last Dance	Sony Pictures	€8,053,117
15	Kingdom of the Planet of the Apes	Walt Disney Studios Motion Pictures	€7,207,147

== See also ==
- Lists of Spanish films — Spanish films by year
- List of Spanish films of 2024
- 2024 in Spain
- List of highest-grossing films in Spain

== Notes ==
Preceded by 2023 Box office number-one films	Box office number-one films 2024	Succeeded by 2025 Box office number-one films
