= List of 2025 box office number-one films in Spain =

The following is a list of 2025 box office number-one films in Spain by week.

== Number-one films ==
This is a list of films which are placed at number one at the weekend box office for the year 2025 in Spain.

#	Date	Film	Gross	Admissions	Notes	Ref
1	January 5, 2025	Mufasa: The Lion King	€1,785,002	232,459	It was the third week of Mufasa: The Lion King in the number-one spot.	
2	January 12, 2025	Mufasa: The Lion King	€1,338,208	180,169		
3	January 19, 2025	Mufasa: The Lion King	€1,018,666	138,755		
4	January 26, 2025	Mufasa: The Lion King	€901,323	120,734		
5	February 2, 2025	Dog Man	€1,037,118	149,559		
6	February 9, 2025	Dog Man	€662,959	95,462		
7	February 16, 2025	Captain America: Brave New World	€2,529,022	319,726		
8	February 23, 2025	Captain America: Brave New World	€1,035,143	131,168		
9	March 2, 2025	A Complete Unknown	€723,452	94,916		
10	March 9, 2025	Mickey 17	€858,273	113,653		
11	March 16, 2025	Wolfgang	€656,938	91,668		
12	March 23, 2025	Snow White	€2,234,163	295,051		
13	March 30, 2025	Snow White	€967,807	127,232		
14	April 6, 2025	A Minecraft Movie	€5,118,490	690,815		
15	April 13, 2025	A Minecraft Movie	€2,747,417	363,252		
16	April 20, 2025	A Minecraft Movie	€1,714,618	225,935		
17	April 27, 2025	A Minecraft Movie	€681,874	95,247		
18	May 4, 2025	Thunderbolts*	€1,356,297	173,639		
19	May 11, 2025	Thunderbolts*	€864,011	111,031		
20	May 18, 2025	Final Destination Bloodlines	€1,015,318	133,134		
21	May 25, 2025	Lilo & Stitch	€5,734,178	757,439		
22	June 1, 2025	Lilo & Stitch	€3,788,240	497,423		
23	June 8, 2025	Lilo & Stitch	€2,357,089	315,801		
24	June 15, 2025	How to Train Your Dragon	€2,841,178	371,735		
25	June 22, 2025	How to Train Your Dragon	€1,774,442	234,006		
26	June 29, 2025	Padre no hay más que uno 5: Nido repleto	€1,946,884	272,447		
27	July 6, 2025	Jurassic World Rebirth	€3,707,260	474,222		
28	July 13, 2025	Superman	€2,470,790	309,491		
29	July 20, 2025	Jurassic World Rebirth	€1,272,671	161,203	Jurassic World Rebirth returned to number one in its third week of release.	
30	July 27, 2025	The Fantastic Four: First Steps	€2,075,122	272,447		
31	August 3, 2025	The Bad Guys 2	€1,251,530	172,823		
32	August 10, 2025	Weapons	€1,346,588	177,170		
33	August 17, 2025	Weapons	€863,876	109,211		
34	August 24, 2025	Weapons	€574,844	73,346		
35	August 31, 2025	Weapons	€458,798	58,230		
36	September 7, 2025	The Conjuring: Last Rites	€4,287,169	541,057		
37	September 14, 2025	Demon Slayer: Kimetsu no Yaiba – The Movie: Infinity Castle	€3,363,401	418,381		
38	September 21, 2025	The Conjuring: Last Rites	€1,067,860	134,980	The Conjuring: Last Rites returned to number one in its third week of release.	
39	September 28, 2025	One Battle After Another	€925,309	120,386		
40	October 5, 2025	One Battle After Another	€704,677	92,889		
41	October 12, 2025	Tron: Ares	€695,526	83,555		
42	October 19, 2025	Gabby's Dollhouse: The Movie	€767,142	107,868		
43	October 26, 2025	Chainsaw Man – The Movie: Reze Arc	€706,025	89,999		
44	November 2, 2025	The Black Phone 2	€538,687	70,384	The Black Phone 2 reached number one in its second week of release.	
45	November 9, 2025	Predator: Badlands	€1,140,515	140,129		
46	November 16, 2025	Now You See Me: Now You Don't	€930,944	122,630		
47	November 23, 2025	Wicked: For Good	€1,773,634	223,661		
48	November 30, 2025	Zootropolis 2	€3,160,185	419,227		
49	December 7, 2025	Zootropolis 2	€2,503,589	327,943		
50	December 14, 2025	Zootropolis 2	€1,623,241	218,674		
51	December 21, 2025	Avatar: Fire and Ash	€6,243,686	725,455		
52	December 28, 2025	Avatar: Fire and Ash	€5,404,522	615,941		

== Highest-grossing films ==
=== In-year release ===
Highest-grossing films of 2025 by in-year release
Rank	Title	Distributor	Gross
1	Avatar: Fire and Ash	Walt Disney	€33,515,091
2	Lilo & Stitch	Walt Disney	€24,709,359
3	Zootropolis 2	Walt Disney	€19,234,117
4	Jurassic World Rebirth	Universal	€18,800,649
5	A Minecraft Movie	Warner Bros.	€16,036,961
6	How to Train Your Dragon	Universal	€14,763,286
7	The Conjuring: Last Rites	Warner Bros.	€13,632,513
8	Padre no hay más que uno 5: Nido repleto	Sony	€13,406,008
9	The Fantastic Four: First Steps	Walt Disney	€9,480,311
10	F1	Warner Bros.	€9,305,828
11	Superman	Warner Bros.	€8,684,879
12	The Bad Guys 2	Universal	€8,105,592
13	Weapons	Warner Bros.	€7,087,094
14	Captain America: Brave New World	Walt Disney	€6,620,714
15	Demon Slayer: Kimetsu no Yaiba – The Movie: Infinity Castle	Sony	€6,462,043

=== Calendar grosses ===
Highest-grossing films of 2025 by calendar grosses
Rank	Title	Distributor	Gross
1	Lilo & Stitch	Walt Disney	€24,709,359
2	Jurassic World Rebirth	Universal	€18,800,649
3	Avatar: Fire and Ash	Walt Disney	€17,755,885
4	A Minecraft Movie	Warner Bros.	€16,036,961
5	How to Train Your Dragon	Universal	€14,763,286
6	Zootropolis 2	Walt Disney	€14,140,597
7	The Conjuring: Last Rites	Warner Bros.	€13,632,513
8	Padre no hay más que uno 5: Nido repleto	Sony	€13,406,008
9	Mufasa: The Lion King (2024)	Walt Disney	€12,794,580
10	The Fantastic Four: First Steps	Walt Disney	€9,480,311

== See also ==
- Lists of Spanish films — Spanish films by year
- List of Spanish films of 2025
- 2025 in Spain
- List of highest-grossing films in Spain

Preceded by 2024 Box office number-one films	Box office number-one films 2025	Succeeded by 2026 Box office number-one films
