= List of 2026 box office number-one films in Spain =

The following is a list of 2026 box office number-one films in Spain by week.

== Number-one films ==
This is a list of films which are placed at number one at the weekend box office for the year 2026 in Spain.

#	Date	Film	Gross	Admissions	Notes	Ref
1	January 4, 2026	Avatar: Fire and Ash	€3,893,276	437,125		
2	January 11, 2026	Avatar: Fire and Ash	€2,164,334	242,842		
3	January 18, 2026	The Housemaid	€1,648,373	215,746	The Housemaid reached number one in its third week of release.	
4	January 26, 2025	The Housemaid	€1,155,650	150,886		
5	February 1, 2026	Aída y vuelta	€1,558,509	208,987		
6	February 8, 2026	Aída y vuelta	€906,946	123,750		
7	February 15, 2026	Wuthering Heights	€1,876,785	238,642		
8	February 22, 2026	Wuthering Heights	€1,105,919	138,430		
9	March 1, 2026	Scream 7	€1,175,746	151,194		
10	March 8, 2026	Hoppers	€2,308,705	304,012		
11	March 15, 2026	Torrente, presidente	€7,246,844	915,815		
12	March 22, 2026	Torrente, presidente	€5,665,875	713,610		
13	March 29, 2026	Torrente, presidente	€2,726,046	344,638		
14	April 5, 2026	The Super Mario Galaxy Movie	€4,910,426	626,201		
10	April 12, 2026	The Super Mario Galaxy Movie	€3,330,689	442,748		
16	April 19, 2026	The Super Mario Galaxy Movie	€1,450,123	190,082		
17	April 26, 2026	Michael	€4,343,400	527,603		
18	May 3, 2026	Michael	€4,373,605	532,766		
19	May 10, 2026	Michael	€2,585,524	324,329		
20	May 17, 2026	Michael	€1,767,426	217,079		
21	May 24, 2026	The Mandalorian and Grogu	€1,683,536	201,190		
22	May 31, 2026	The Mandalorian and Grogu	€813,644	97,491		
23	June 7, 2026	Backrooms	€1,696,097	217,204		
24	June 14, 2026	Disclosure Day	€2,343,494	289,057		
25	June 21, 2026	Toy Story 5	€3,310,193	431,500		
26	June 28, 2026	Toy Story 5	€2,517,162	327,669		
27	July 5, 2026	Minions & Monsters	€2,355,302	306,479		
28	July 12, 2026	Moana	€1,541,074	197,826		
29	July 19, 2026	The Odyssey	€4,476,672	526,110		
30	July 26, 2026	The Odyssey	€4,810,589	558,681		
31	August 2, 2026	Spider-Man: Brand New Day	€8,020,823	987,007		
32	August 9, 2026	Spider-Man: Brand New Day	€4,292,612	517,605		
33	August 16, 2026	Spider-Man: Brand New Day	€2,416,573	291,868		
34	August 23, 2026	Spider-Man: Brand New Day	€1,422,343	169,166		
35	August 30, 2026	Tadeo Jones y la lámpara maravillosa	€1,583,444	222,362		
36	September 6, 2026	Tadeo Jones y la lámpara maravillosa	€976,763	134,201		
37	September 13, 2026	Tadeo Jones y la lámpara maravillosa	€624,090	91,345		
38	September 20, 2026	Resident Evil	€2,064,146	263,840		
39	September 27, 2026	La bola negra	€4,814,581	634,560		
40	October 4, 2026	La bola negra	€5,989,992	788,043		
41	October 11, 2026	La bola negra	€4,958,741	641,276		
42	October 18, 2026	La bola negra	€2,891,313	370,609		
43	October 25, 2026	La bola negra	€2,027,019	256,524		
44	November 1, 2026	La bola negra	€1,272,393	157,123		
45	November 8, 2026	La bola negra	€1,007,157	123,595		
46	November 15, 2026	Ebenezer	€895,182	119,000		

== Highest-grossing films ==
=== In-year release ===
Highest-grossing films of 2026 by in-year release
Rank	Title	Distributor	Gross
1	Spider-Man: Brand New Day	Sony	€40,125,410
2	La bola negra	Elastica	€39,729,673
3	The Odyssey	Universal	€39,587,127
4	Torrente, presidente	Sony	€28,136,127
5	Michael	Universal	€24,266,519
6	The Super Mario Galaxy Movie	Universal	€21,486,016
7	Toy Story 5	Walt Disney	€19,727,728
8	The Housemaid	Diamond Films	€14,659,570
9	Minions & Monsters	Universal	€13,793,663
10	The Devil Wears Prada 2	Universal	€11,097,436

=== Calendar grosses ===
Highest-grossing films of 2026 by calendar grosses
Rank	Title	Distributor	Gross
1	Spider-Man: Brand New Day	Sony	€40,125,410
2	La bola negra	Elastica	€39,729,673
3	The Odyssey	Universal	€39,587,127
4	Torrente, presidente	Sony	€28,136,127
5	Michael	Universal	€24,266,519
6	The Super Mario Galaxy Movie	Universal	€21,486,016
7	Toy Story 5	Walt Disney	€19,727,728
8	Avatar: Fire and Ash	Walt Disney	€17,299,904
9	The Housemaid	Diamond Films	€14,659,570
10	Minions & Monsters	Universal	€13,793,663

== See also ==
- Lists of Spanish films — Spanish films by year
- List of Spanish films of 2026
- 2026 in Spain
- List of highest-grossing films in Spain

Preceded by 2025	Box office number-one films 2026	Succeeded by 2027
