= List of 2023 box office number-one films in Spain =

The following is a list of 2023 box office number-one films in Spain by week.

== Number-one Films ==
This is a list of films which are placed at number one at the weekend box office for the year 2023 in Spain.

†	This implies the highest-grossing movie of the year.

#	Date	Film	Gross	Notes	Ref
1	January 8, 2023	Avatar: The Way of Water	€4,832,483	It was Avatar: The Way of Water fourth weekend at the top spot.	
2	January 15, 2023	Avatar: The Way of Water	€2,870,000		
3	January 22, 2023	Avatar: The Way of Water	€2,028,959		
4	January 29, 2023	Avatar: The Way of Water	€1,572,825		
5	February 5, 2023	Avatar: The Way of Water	€1,090,842		
6	February 12, 2023	Avatar: The Way of Water	€727,197		
7	February 19, 2023	Ant-Man and the Wasp: Quantumania	€2,128,627		
8	February 26, 2023	Mummies (Momias)	€1,420,191	Mummies is the first of four Spanish films to reach number one in 2023 to date.	
9	March 5, 2023	Creed III	€1,848,984		
10	March 12, 2023	Creed III	€934,174		
11	March 19, 2023	Co-Husbands (Mari(dos))	€661,005	Co-Husbands is the second of four Spanish films to reach number one in 2023 to date. It reached the top-spot at its second weekend.	
12	March 26, 2023	John Wick: Chapter 4	€1,223,617		
13	April 2, 2023	Dungeons & Dragons: Honor Among Thieves	€899,534		
14	April 9, 2023	The Super Mario Bros. Movie	€4,344,648		
15	April 16, 2023	The Super Mario Bros. Movie	€4,001,077		
16	April 23, 2023	The Super Mario Bros. Movie	€2,643,186		
17	April 30, 2023	The Super Mario Bros. Movie	€1,904,636		
18	May 7, 2023	Guardians of the Galaxy Vol. 3	€3,093,777		
19	May 14, 2023	Guardians of the Galaxy Vol. 3	€1,897,265		
20	May 21, 2023	Fast X	€5,050,970		
21	May 28, 2023	The Little Mermaid	€3,181,128		
22	June 4, 2023	Spider-Man: Across the Spider-Verse	€2,182,821		
23	June 11, 2023	Spider-Man: Across the Spider-Verse	€1,184,508		
24	June 18, 2023	The Flash	€1,253,887		
25	June 25, 2023	The Flash	€501,067	The second week of The Flash currently has the lowest number-one weekend of 2023.	
26	July 2, 2023	Indiana Jones and the Dial of Destiny	€2,611,000		
27	July 9, 2023	Indiana Jones and the Dial of Destiny	€1,574,136		
28	July 16, 2023	Elemental	€1,956,690		
29	July 23, 2023	Barbie †	€5,150,971	Barbie currently has the highest number-one weekend and debut of 2023.	
30	July 30, 2023	Barbie †	€3,629,001		
31	August 6, 2023	Meg 2: The Trench	€3,113,441		
32	August 13, 2023	Meg 2: The Trench	€1,262,025		
33	August 20, 2023	Championext (Campeonex)	€1,733,458	Championext is the third of four Spanish films to reach number one in 2023 to date.	
34	August 27, 2023	Championext (Campeonex)	€1,299,595		
35	September 3, 2023	The Equalizer 3	€1,498,128		
36	September 10, 2023	The Nun II	€2,102,523		
37	September 17, 2023	A Haunting in Venice	€1,069,315		
38	September 24, 2023	A Haunting in Venice	€715,312		
39	October 1, 2023	The Creator	€702,465	The Creator currently has the lowest number-one weekend debut of 2023.	
40	October 8, 2023	The Exorcist: Believer	€939,149		
41	October 15, 2023	Taylor Swift: The Eras Tour	€1,138,510		
42	October 22, 2023	Killers of the Flower Moon	€1,292,223		
43	October 29, 2023	Trolls Band Together	€1,198,392		
44	November 5, 2023	Five Nights at Freddy's	€2,232,580		
45	November 12, 2023	The Marvels	€1,291,101		
46	November 19, 2023	The Hunger Games: The Ballad of Songbirds & Snakes	€1,965,030		
47	November 26, 2023	Napoleon	€2,993,250		
48	December 3, 2023	A Moroccan Affair (Ocho Apellidos Marroquís)	€1,684,029	A Moroccan Affair is the fourth of four Spanish films to reach number one in 2023 to date.	
49	December 10, 2023	Wonka	€2,160,472	Record for the most weeks (12) with a different number-one.	
50	December 17, 2023	Wonka	€1,377,789		
51	December 24, 2023	Aquaman and the Lost Kingdom	€795,097		
52	December 31, 2023	Wonka	€758,281	Wonka reclaimed the number-one spot in its fourth week of release.	

== Highest-grossing films ==
=== In-year release ===
Highest-grossing films of 2023 by in-year release
Rank	Title	Distributor	Domestic gross
1	Barbie	Warner Bros. Pictures	€33,717,110
2	The Super Mario Bros. Movie	Universal Pictures	€27,514,993
3	Oppenheimer^{O}	Universal Pictures	€21,120,174
4	Wonka	Warner Bros. Pictures	€14,771,173
5	A Moroccan Affair	Universal Pictures	€13,077,354
6	Fast X	Universal Pictures	€12,974,679
7	Elemental	Walt Disney Studios Motion Pictures	€12,787,252
8	Meg 2: The Trench	Warner Bros. Pictures	€11,985,307
9	Championext	Universal Pictures	€11,915,170
10	The Little Mermaid	Walt Disney Studios Motion Pictures	€11,856,750
11	Indiana Jones and the Dial of Destiny	Walt Disney Studios Motion Pictures	€11,797,061
12	Guardians of the Galaxy Vol. 3	Walt Disney Studios Motion Pictures	€11,313,055
13	Napoleon	Sony Pictures	€10,067,301
14	Spider-Man: Across the Spider-Verse	Sony Pictures	€8,210,943
15	The Hunger Games: The Ballad of Songbirds and Snakes	Vértice 360	€7,986,029

^{O}Oppenheimer is the highest-grossing film ever in Spain with no number-ones.

=== Calendar gross ===
Highest-grossing films of 2023 by calendar grosses
Rank	Title	Distributor	Domestic gross
1	Barbie	Warner Bros. Pictures	€33,717,110
2	The Super Mario Bros. Movie	Universal Pictures	€27,514,993
3	Avatar: The Way of Water (2022)	Walt Disney Studios Motion Pictures	€25,473,622
4	Oppenheimer	Universal Pictures	€20,770,550
5	Fast X	Universal Pictures	€12,974,679
6	Elemental	Walt Disney Studios Motion Pictures	€12,787,252
7	Meg 2: The Trench	Warner Bros. Pictures	€11,985,307
8	Championext	Universal Pictures	€11,888,158
9	The Little Mermaid	Walt Disney Studios Motion Pictures	€11,856,750
10	Indiana Jones and the Dial of Destiny	Walt Disney Studios Motion Pictures	€11,797,061
11	Guardians of the Galaxy Vol. 3	Walt Disney Studios Motion Pictures	€11,313,055
12	Wonka	Warner Bros. Pictures	€9,846,677
13	Napoleon	Sony Pictures	€9,347,917
14	A Moroccan Affair	Universal Pictures	€8,883,294
15	Spider-Man: Across the Spider-Verse	Sony Pictures	€8,210,943

== See also ==
- List of Spanish films — Spanish films by year
- List of Spanish films of 2023
- 2023 in Spain

Preceded by 2022 Box office number-one films	Box office number-one films 2023	Succeeded by 2024 Box office number-one films
