= List of 2010 box office number-one films in Spain =

This is a list of films which have placed number one at the weekend box office in Spain during 2010.

== Number-one films ==
†	This implies the highest-grossing movie of the year.

#	Date	Film	Gross in euros	Gross in US dollars	Notes
1	January 3, 2010	Avatar	€6,705,312	$9,649,320	It was Avatar's third week at number one.
2	January 10, 2010	Avatar	€4,650,728	$6,704,235	Avatar became the highest-grossing film in Spain of all time.
3	January 17, 2010	Avatar	€4,342,660	$6,249,331	
4	January 24, 2010	Avatar	€3,994,297	$5,648,045	
5	January 31, 2010	Avatar	€3,641,889	$5,050,393	
6	February 7, 2010	Avatar	€3,037,379	$4,156,182	
7	February 14, 2010	Avatar	€2,343,026	$3,195,398	
8	February 21, 2010	Shutter Island	€2,438,309	$3,320,228	
9	February 28, 2010	Shutter Island	€1,625,337	$2,215,926	
10	March 7, 2010	The Men Who Stare at Goats	€1,354,341	$1,846,007	
11	March 14, 2010	Green Zone	€1,117,164	$1,538,751	
12	March 21, 2010	The Book of Eli	€1,377,132	$1,864,214	
13	March 28, 2010	How to Train Your Dragon	€1,787,792	$2,394,033	
14	April 4, 2010	Clash of the Titans	€4,121,454	$5,565,171	
15	April 11, 2010	Clash of the Titans	€1,678,598	$2,266,875	
16	April 18, 2010	Alice in Wonderland	€7,613,995	$10,283,762	Alice in Wonderland had the highest weekend debut of 2010.
17	April 25, 2010	Alice in Wonderland	€4,225,262	$5,655,096	
18	May 2, 2010	Alice in Wonderland	€2,759,010	$3,668,214	
19	May 9, 2010	Alice in Wonderland	€1,835,074	$2,342,000	
20	May 16, 2010	Robin Hood	€3,619,396	$4,475,075	
21	May 23, 2010	Prince of Persia: The Sands of Time	€2,400,479	$3,019,433	
22	May 30, 2010	Prince of Persia: The Sands of Time	€1,641,834	$2,015,856	
23	June 6, 2010	Sex and the City 2	€1,460,892	$1,749,089	
24	June 13, 2010	Prince of Persia: The Sands of Time	€955,268	$1,157,480	Prince of Persia: The Sands of Time reclaimed #1 in its fourth weekend of release.
25	June 20, 2010	Marmaduke	€722,937	$894,447	Marmaduke had the lowest number-one weekend debut of 2010.
26	June 27, 2010	Marmaduke	€502,723	$622,090	The second weekend of Marmaduke had the lowest number-one weekend of 2010.
27	July 4, 2010	The Twilight Saga: Eclipse	€5,260,905	$6,613,497	
28	July 11, 2010	Shrek Forever After	€3,249,149	$4,108,634	
29	July 18, 2010	Shrek Forever After	€3,385,900	$4,379,641	
30	July 25, 2010	Toy Story 3 †	€4,049,875	$5,230,639	
31	August 1, 2010	Toy Story 3 †	€2,789,135	$3,641,358	
32	August 8, 2010	Inception	€3,402,776	$4,520,400	
33	August 15, 2010	Inception	€2,190,265	$2,794,561	
34	August 22, 2010	Salt	€1,941,164	$2,468,292	
35	August 29, 2010	The Karate Kid	€2,993,255	$3,821,827	
36	September 5, 2010	The Sorcerer's Apprentice	€1,712,757	$2,209,553	
37	September 12, 2010	Resident Evil: Afterlife	€2,651,992	$3,364,447	
38	September 19, 2010	The American	€1,200,073	$1,566,757	
39	September 26, 2010	Eat Pray Love	€1,493,574	$2,015,891	
40	October 3, 2010	Vampires Suck	€1,114,715	$1,537,856	
41	October 10, 2010	Despicable Me	€2,467,220	$3,439,976	
42	October 17, 2010	Despicable Me	€1,603,187	$2,241,592	
43	October 24, 2010	Despicable Me	€961,387	$1,342,176	
44	October 31, 2010	Los ojos de Julia	€1,601,321	$2,234,142	
45	November 7, 2010	Los ojos de Julia	€1,119,884	$1,571,922	
46	November 14, 2010	Unstoppable	€1,157,502	$1,585,272	
47	November 21, 2010	Harry Potter and the Deathly Hallows – Part 1	€5,898,426	$8,067,768	
48	November 28, 2010	Harry Potter and the Deathly Hallows – Part 1	€2,759,993	$3,656,104	
49	December 5, 2010	The Chronicles of Narnia: The Voyage of the Dawn Treader	€2,141,435	$2,874,139	
50	December 12, 2010	The Chronicles of Narnia: The Voyage of the Dawn Treader	€1,662,550	$2,199,839	
51	December 19, 2010	Tron: Legacy	€1,252,788	$1,652,886	
52	December 26, 2010	Little Fockers	€1,976,127	$2,594,091	

== Highest-grossing films ==
Highest-grossing films of 2010
Rank	Title	Distributor	Director(s)	Release	Country	Domestic Gross
1.	Toy Story 3	Disney	Lee Unkrich	July 21	United States	$33,154,762
2.	Alice in Wonderland	Disney	Tim Burton	April 16	United States	$28,769,165
3.	The Twilight Saga: Eclipse	Aurum	David Slade	June 30	United States	$25,050,394
4.	Inception	Warner Bros.	Christopher Nolan	August 6	United Kingdom; United States	$22,212,764
5.	Shrek Forever After	Paramount	Mike Mitchell	July 8	United States	$21,928,719
6.	Harry Potter and the Deathly Hallows – Part 1	Warner Bros.	David Yates	November 19	United Kingdom; United States	$19,017,186
7.	The King's Speech	DeAPlaneta	Tom Hooper	December 24	United Kingdom	$15,863,460
8.	The Chronicles of Narnia: The Voyage of the Dawn Treader	Fox	Michael Apted	December 3	United Kingdom; United States	$14,992,713
9.	Clash of the Titans	Warner Bros.	Louis Leterrier	March 31	United States; United Kingdom	$14,556,322
10.	Despicable Me	Universal	Pierre Coffin & Chris Renaud	October 8	United States	$14,257,017

== See also ==
- List of Spanish films — Spanish films by year
