= List of 2007 box office number-one films in Spain =

This is a list of films which placed number one at the weekend box office for the year 2007 in Spain.

== Number-one films ==
†	This implies the highest-grossing movie of the year.

#	Date	Film	Gross in US dollars	Notes
1	January 7, 2007	Babel	$1,588,529	It was Babel's second week at number one.
2	January 14, 2007	Rocky Balboa	$3,400,463	
3	January 21, 2007	Apocalypto	$1,944,875	
4	January 28, 2007	Night at the Museum	$5,670,564	
5	February 4, 2007	Night at the Museum	$3,769,192	
6	February 11, 2007	Blood Diamond	$2,326,037	
7	February 18, 2007	Ghost Rider	$3,121,567	
8	February 25, 2007	Ghost Rider	$1,538,075	
9	March 4, 2007	Bridge to Terabithia	$1,827,294	
10	March 11, 2007	Epic Movie	$1,764,097	
11	March 18, 2007	Hannibal Rising	$1,716,848	
12	March 25, 2007	300	$6,712,930	
13	April 1, 2007	300	$3,682,934	
14	April 8, 2007	300	$2,191,660	
15	April 15, 2007	Perfect Stranger	$1,921,042	
16	April 22, 2007	Music and Lyrics	$1,136,894	Music and Lyrics had the lowest number-one weekend debut of 2007.
17	April 29, 2007	Premonition	$1,271,403	
18	May 6, 2007	Spider-Man 3	$11,081,649	
19	May 13, 2007	Spider-Man 3	$4,372,391	
20	May 20, 2007	Spider-Man 3	$2,571,786	
21	May 27, 2007	Pirates of the Caribbean: At World's End	$11,894,728	Pirates of the Caribbean: At World's End had the highest number-one weekend of 2007.
22	June 3, 2007	Pirates of the Caribbean: At World's End	$5,870,386	
23	June 10, 2007	Ocean's Thirteen	$3,029,549	
24	June 17, 2007	Ocean's Thirteen	$1,889,236	
25	June 24, 2007	Shrek the Third	$7,266,060	
26	July 1, 2007	Shrek the Third	$4,992,339	
27	July 8, 2007	Transformers	$3,457,591	
28	July 15, 2007	Harry Potter and the Order of the Phoenix	$6,560,514	
29	July 22, 2007	Harry Potter and the Order of the Phoenix	$2,918,262	
30	July 29, 2007	The Simpsons Movie	$7,220,768	
31	August 5, 2007	Ratatouille	$3,600,886	
32	August 12, 2007	Fantastic Four: Rise of the Silver Surfer	$3,338,677	
33	August 19, 2007	The Bourne Ultimatum	$2,477,224	
34	August 26, 2007	Evan Almighty	$1,712,151	
35	September 2, 2007	The Bourne Ultimatum (2)	$1,058,639	The Bourne Ultimatum reclaimed #1 spot in its third weekend of release. It had the lowest number-one weekend of 2007.
36	September 9, 2007	Live Free or Die Hard	$3,576,301	
37	September 16, 2007	Live Free or Die Hard	$1,847,713	
38	September 23, 2007	No Reservations	$1,459,055	
39	September 30, 2007	Rush Hour 3	$1,278,378	
40	October 7, 2007	Eastern Promises	$1,274,718	
41	October 14, 2007	El orfanato †	$7,438,054	El orfanato was the first and only Spanish film to reach #1 in 2007.
42	October 21, 2007	El orfanato †	$5,138,592	
43	October 28, 2007	El orfanato †	$4,052,462	
44	November 4, 2007	El orfanato †	$3,284,684	
45	November 11, 2007	El orfanato †	$2,378,553	
46	November 18, 2007	El orfanato †	$1,512,851	
47	November 25, 2007	Enchanted	$3,231,477	
48	December 2, 2007	Bee Movie	$2,762,266	
49	December 9, 2007	The Golden Compass	$5,169,575	
50	December 16, 2007	The Golden Compass	$2,535,851	
51	December 23, 2007	I Am Legend	$4,979,952	
52	December 30, 2007	American Gangster	$3,505,548	

== Highest-grossing films ==
Highest-grossing films of 2007
Rank	Title	Distributor	Director(s)	Release	Country	Domestic Gross
1.	El orfanato	Warner Bros.	Juan Antonio Bayona	October 11	Spain	$37,725,830
2.	Pirates of the Caribbean: At World's End	Buena Vista	Gore Verbinski	May 24	United States	$31,487,539
3.	Shrek the Third	Paramount	Chris Miller & Raman Hui	June 22	United States	$30,413,846
4.	The Simpsons Movie	Fox	David Silverman	July 27	United States	$25,325,129
5.	Harry Potter and the Order of the Phoenix	Warner Bros.	David Yates	July 11	United Kingdom; United States	$24,972,080
6.	Spider-Man 3	Sony	Sam Raimi	May 4	United States	$24,665,705
7.	Ratatouille	Buena Vista	Brad Bird	August 3	United States	$21,473,012
8.	300	Warner Bros.	Zack Snyder	March 23	United States	$20,762,055
9.	I Am Legend	Warner Bros.	Francis Lawrence	December 19	United States	$19,274,927
10.	The Golden Compass	Tri Pictures	Chris Weitz	December 5	United States; United Kingdom	$19,180,460

== See also ==
- List of Spanish films — Spanish films by year
