= List of 2017 box office number-one films in Spain =

This is a list of films which placed number one at the weekend box office for the year 2017 in Spain.

#	Date	Film	Gross in euros	Gross in US dollars	Notes
1	January 8, 2017	Sing (3)	€1,485,381	$1,564,712	It was Sing's third week at number one.
2	January 15, 2017	La La Land	€1,902,619	$2,025,140	
3	January 22, 2017	La La Land (2)	€1,722,094	$1,842,797	
4	January 29, 2017	Split	€1,847,029	$1,976,066	
5	February 5, 2017	Ballerina	€1,348,151	$1,454,002	Ballerina reached the number-one spot in its second weekend of release.
6	February 12, 2017	Fifty Shades Darker	€4,760,707	$5,065,660	
7	February 19, 2017	Fifty Shades Darker (2)	€2,279,038	$2,418,847	
8	February 26, 2017	Es por tu bien	€1,604,678	$1,694,844	Es por tu bien was the first (of only two) Spanish film to reach the number-one spot in 2017.
9	March 5, 2017	Logan	€2,294,952	$2,438,066	
10	March 12, 2017	Kong: Skull Island	€1,537,844	$1,641,417	
11	March 19, 2017	Beauty and the Beast	€5,470,241	$5,874,400	
12	March 26, 2017	Beauty and the Beast (2)	€4,506,657	$4,866,275	
13	April 2, 2017	Beauty and the Beast (3)	€2,279,112	$2,428,462	
14	April 9, 2017	Smurfs: The Lost Village	€1,132,835	$1,199,656	
15	April 16, 2017	The Fate of the Furious	€5,771,230	$6,125,271	
16	April 23, 2017	The Fate of the Furious (2)	€1,766,155	$1,894,000	
17	April 30, 2017	Guardians of the Galaxy Vol. 2	€3,276,458	$3,569,904	
18	May 7, 2017	Guardians of the Galaxy Vol. 2 (2)	€4,232,464	$4,655,152	
19	May 14, 2017	Alien: Covenant	€4,946,834	$5,408,149	
20	May 21, 2017	Get Out	€3,932,824	$4,407,513	
21	May 28, 2017	Pirates of the Caribbean: Dead Men Tell No Tales	€5,914,506	$6,612,820	
22	June 4, 2017	Pirates of the Caribbean: Dead Men Tell No Tales (2)	€2,030,462	$2,290,942	
23	June 11, 2017	The Mummy	€2,516,792	$2,817,410	
24	June 18, 2017	The Mummy (2)	€1,192,285	$1,334,996	
25	June 25, 2017	Wonder Woman	€2,200,000	$2,462,778	
26	July 2, 2017	Despicable Me 3	€4,714,542	$5,386,817	
27	July 9, 2017	Despicable Me 3 (2)	€2,496,081	$2,845,510	
28	July 16, 2017	War for the Planet of the Apes	€2,881,291	$3,304,612	
29	July 23, 2017	Dunkirk	€1,678,945	$1,958,639	
30	July 30, 2017	Spider-Man: Homecoming	€2,828,241	$3,323,042	
31	August 6, 2017	Spider-Man: Homecoming (2)	€1,119,315	$1,317,771	
32	August 13, 2017	The Emoji Movie	€1,193,175	$1,402,251	
33	August 20, 2017	Valerian and the City of a Thousand Planets	€752,037	$884,437	Valerian and the City of a Thousand Planets had the lowest number-one weekend of 2017.
34	August 27, 2017	Tad the Lost Explorer and the Secret of King Midas	€2,644,371	$3,153,316	Tad the Lost Explorer and the Secret of King Midas was the second (of only two) Spanish film to reach the number-one spot in 2017.
35	September 3, 2017	Tad the Lost Explorer and the Secret of King Midas (2)	€1,963,600	$2,328,748	
36	September 10, 2017	It	€3,137,068	$3,137,068	
37	September 17, 2017	It (2)	€1,671,765	$1,997,330	
38	September 24, 2017	Kingsman: The Golden Circle	€1,384,340	$1,654,326	
39	October 1, 2017	It (3)	€854,391	$1,009,441	It reclaimed the number-one spot in its fourth weekend of release.
40	October 8, 2017	Blade Runner 2049	€2,179,258	$2,556,314	
41	October 15, 2017	Blade Runner 2049 (2)	€1,071,210	$1,266,355	
42	October 22, 2017	Geostorm	€843,938	$997,681	
43	October 29, 2017	Thor: Ragnarok	€3,014,124	$3,499,099	
44	November 5, 2017	Thor: Ragnarok (2)	€1,716,087	$1,991,976	
45	November 12, 2017	Thor: Ragnarok (3)	€970,686	$1,132,260	
46	November 19, 2017	Justice League	€2,668,750	$3,146,740	
47	November 26, 2017	Murder on the Orient Express	€2,158,578	$2,575,869	
48	December 3, 2017	Coco	€2,443,051	$2,905,627	
49	December 10, 2017	Coco (2)	€2,860,912	$3,368,156	
50	December 17, 2017	Star Wars: The Last Jedi	€7,270,946	$8,542,998	Star Wars: The Last Jedi had the highest number-one weekend of 2017.
51	December 24, 2017	Star Wars: The Last Jedi (2)	€2,217,007	$2,629,901	
52	December 31, 2017	Star Wars: The Last Jedi (3)	€1,421,490	$1,706,471	

== Highest-grossing films ==
Highest-grossing films of 2017 in Spain
Rank	Title	Distributor	Director(s)	Release	Country	Domestic Gross
1.	Star Wars: The Last Jedi	Disney	Rian Johnson	December 15	United States	$24,521,794
2.	Beauty and the Beast	Disney	Bill Condon	March 17	United States	$24,076,226
3.	Despicable Me 3	Universal	Pierre Coffin & Kyle Balda	June 30	United States	$23,328,887
4.	Tad the Lost Explorer and the Secret of King Midas	Paramount	David Alonso & Enrique Gato	August 25	Spain	$21,312,905
5.	Perfect Strangers	Universal	Álex de la Iglesia	December 1	Spain	$19,973,829
6.	Coco	Disney	Lee Unkrich	December 1	United States	$18,075,734
7.	The Fate of the Furious	Universal	F. Gary Gray	April 13	United States	$15,497,540
8.	The Boss Baby	Fox	Tom McGrath	April 14	United States	$15,195,493
9.	La La Land	Universal	Damien Chazelle	January 13	United States	$14,914,091
10.	Pirates of the Caribbean: Dead Men Tell No Tales	Disney	Joachim Rønning and Espen Sandberg	May 26	United States	$14,897,137

== See also ==
- List of Spanish films — Spanish films by year
