= List of 2013 box office number-one films in Spain =

This is a list of films which placed number one at the weekend box office for the year 2013 in Spain.

== Number-one films ==
†	This implies the highest-grossing movie of the year.

#	Date	Film	Gross in euros	Gross in US dollars	Notes
1	January 6, 2013	The Hobbit: An Unexpected Journey	€1,118,927	$1,462,478	It was The Hobbit: An Unexpected Journey fourth week at number one.
2	January 13, 2013	Jack Reacher	€1,121,703	$1,496,821	
3	January 20, 2013	Django Unchained	€2,534,733	$3,376,672	
4	January 27, 2013	Django Unchained	€1,758,228	$2,367,378	
5	February 3, 2013	Django Unchained	€1,267,551	$1,729,217	
6	February 10, 2013	Mama	€2,679,162	$3,582,150	Mama was the first Spanish film to reach number one in 2013
7	February 17, 2013	Mama	€1,617,022	$2,160,812	
8	February 24, 2013	Mama	€1,131,632	$1,492,958	
9	March 3, 2013	Hansel and Gretel: Witch Hunters	€1,695,912	$2,208,362	
10	March 10, 2013	Oz the Great and Powerful	€2,011,039	$2,615,611	
11	March 17, 2013	Oz the Great and Powerful	€1,302,544	$1,703,362	
12	March 24, 2013	The Croods	€2,562,667	$3,328,917	
13	March 31, 2013	The Croods	€2,836,101	$3,636,074	
14	April 7, 2013	The Croods	€1,392,976	$1,810,447	
15	April 14, 2013	Oblivion	€2,208,164	$2,896,181	
16	April 21, 2013	Oblivion	€1,111,855	$1,451,546	
17	April 28, 2013	Iron Man 3	€3,828,477	$4,990,454	
18	May 5, 2013	Iron Man 3	€1,324,655	$1,737,526	
19	May 12, 2013	Iron Man 3	€788,630	$1,024,781	
20	May 19, 2013	The Great Gatsby	€1,565,598	$2,010,450	
21	May 26, 2013	Fast & Furious 6	€4,060,751	$5,253,168	
22	June 2, 2013	The Hangover Part III	€2,173,727	$2,826,068	
23	June 9, 2013	The Hangover Part III	€1,032,520	$1,365,208	
24	June 16, 2013	The Hangover Part III	€421,835	$563,145	The third weekend of The Hangover Part III had the lowest number-one weekend of 2013.
25	June 23, 2013	Man of Steel	€2,991,715	$3,926,857	
26	June 30, 2013	After Earth	€2,336,420	$3,040,392	
27	July 7, 2013	Despicable Me 2	€2,584,371	$3,316,996	
28	July 14, 2013	Despicable Me 2	€1,583,212	$2,069,504	
29	July 21, 2013	Now You See Me	€1,734,335	$2,279,950	
30	July 28, 2013	The Wolverine	€1,470,665	$1,953,334	
31	August 4, 2013	World War Z	€3,535,468	$4,696,674	
32	August 11, 2013	World War Z	€1,508,255	$2,013,020	
33	August 18, 2013	Elysium	€2,294,232	$3,058,528	
34	August 25, 2013	The Lone Ranger	€1,452,663	$1,944,741	
35	September 1, 2013	Epic	€1,096,391	$1,449,869	
36	September 8, 2013	Riddick	€915,945	$1,207,495	
37	September 15, 2013	White House Down	€1,036,647	$1,378,703	
38	September 22, 2013	Justin and the Knights of Valour	€591,010	$799,581	Justin and the Knights of Valour had the lowest weekend debut of 2013. It was the second Spanish film to reach number one in 2013.
39	September 29, 2013	Las brujas de Zugarramurdi	€1,239,395	$1,676,240	Las brujas de Zugarramurdi was the third Spanish film to reach number one in 2013.
40	October 6, 2013	Gravity	€1,665,659	$2,258,797	
41	October 13, 2013	Gravity	€1,442,010	$1,953,917	
42	October 20, 2013	Turbo	€1,264,447	$1,730,791	
43	October 27, 2013	Insidious: Chapter 2	€1,372,496	$1,894,745	
44	November 3, 2013	Thor: The Dark World	€2,475,753	$3,339,249	
45	November 10, 2013	Thor: The Dark World	€1,128,495	$1,509,510	
46	November 17, 2013	Blue Jasmine	€1,110,805	$1,499,284	
47	November 24, 2013	The Hunger Games: Catching Fire	€4,246,318	$5,757,797	
48	December 1, 2013	Frozen	€2,535,718	$3,446,721	
49	December 8, 2013	Frozen	€2,867,345	$3,930,723	
50	December 15, 2013	The Hobbit: The Desolation of Smaug †	€5,126,083	$7,047,421	The Hobbit: The Desolation of Smaug had the highest weekend debut of 2013.
51	December 22, 2013	The Hobbit: The Desolation of Smaug †	€2,610,000	N/A	
52	December 29, 2013	The Hobbit: The Desolation of Smaug †	€1,895,151	$2,606,989	

== Highest-grossing films ==
Highest-grossing films of 2013
Rank	Title	Distributor	Director(s)	Release	Country	Domestic Gross
1.	The Hobbit: The Desolation of Smaug	Warner Bros.	Peter Jackson	December 13	New Zealand; United States	$23,551,615
2.	Frozen	Disney	Chris Buck & Jennifer Lee	November 29	United States	$21,671,340
3.	The Croods	Fox	Kirk DeMicco & Chris Sanders	March 22	United States	$18,545,419
4.	Despicable Me 2	Universal	Pierre Coffin & Chris Renaud	July 5	United States	$17,553,152
5.	World War Z	Paramount	Marc Forster	August 2	United States	$16,291,919
6.	The Hunger Games: Catching Fire	eOne	Francis Lawrence	November 22	United States	$15,174,823
7.	Monsters University	Disney	Dan Scanlon	June 21	United States	$14,627,988
8.	Django Unchained	Sony	Quentin Tarantino	January 18	United States	$14,328,129
9.	Now You See Me	eOne	Louis Leterrier	July 19	United States, France	$14,011,019
10.	The Smurfs 2	Sony	Raja Gosnell	August 2	United States	$13,176,761

== See also ==
- List of Spanish films — Spanish films by year
