= List of 2020 box office number-one films in Spain =

This is a list of films which placed number one at the weekend box office for the year 2020 in Spain.

== Number-one films ==
†	This implies the highest-grossing movie of the year.

#	Date	Film	Gross	Notes
1	January 5, 2020	Star Wars: The Rise of Skywalker	US$1,540,955	
2	January 12, 2020	1917	US$1,841,882	
3	January 19, 2020	Bad Boys for Life	US$2,155,627	Highest-grossing opening of the year.
4	January 26, 2020	Dolittle	US$1,920,787	
5	February 2, 2020	Dolittle	US$1,387,154	
6	February 9, 2020	Birds of Prey	US$1,371,817	
7	February 16, 2020	Sonic the Hedgehog	US$2,007,670	
8	February 23, 2020	Sonic the Hedgehog	US$1,018,322	
9	March 1, 2020	The Invisible Man	US$1,111,823	
10	March 8, 2020	Onward	US$1,744,352	
11	March 15, 2020	Bloodshot	US$3,741	
12	March 22, 2020	Spanish cinemas closed and box office reporting suspended due to the COVID-19 pandemic		
13	March 29, 2020	Spanish cinemas closed and box office reporting suspended due to the COVID-19 pandemic		
14	April 5, 2020	Spanish cinemas closed and box office reporting suspended due to the COVID-19 pandemic		
15	April 12, 2020	Spanish cinemas closed and box office reporting suspended due to the COVID-19 pandemic		
16	April 19, 2020	Spanish cinemas closed and box office reporting suspended due to the COVID-19 pandemic		
17	April 26, 2020	Spanish cinemas closed and box office reporting suspended due to the COVID-19 pandemic		
18	May 3, 2020	Spanish cinemas closed and box office reporting suspended due to the COVID-19 pandemic		
19	May 10, 2020	Spanish cinemas closed and box office reporting suspended due to the COVID-19 pandemic		
20	May 17, 2020	Spanish cinemas closed and box office reporting suspended due to the COVID-19 pandemic		
21	May 24, 2020	Spanish cinemas closed and box office reporting suspended due to the COVID-19 pandemic		
22	May 31, 2020	Spanish cinemas closed and box office reporting suspended due to the COVID-19 pandemic		
23	June 7, 2020	Spanish cinemas closed and box office reporting suspended due to the COVID-19 pandemic		
24	June 14, 2020	The Invisible Man	US$8,903	
25	June 21, 2020	The Invisible Man	US$14,414	
26	June 28, 2020	1917	US$549	
27	July 5, 2020	The Invisible Man	US$34,255	
28	July 12, 2020	The Invisible Man	US$27,091	
29	July 19, 2020	The Invisible Man	US$13,421	
30	July 26, 2020	Superagente Makey	US$243,315	
31	August 2, 2020	Padre no hay más que uno 2: La llegada de la suegra †	US$1,652,591	
32	August 9, 2020	Padre no hay más que uno 2: La llegada de la suegra †	US$1,200,000	
33	August 16, 2020	Padre no hay más que uno 2: La llegada de la suegra †	US$1,000,000	
34	August 23, 2020	The Hunt	US$88,636	
35	August 30, 2020	Padre no hay más que uno 2: La llegada de la suegra †	US$700,000	
36	September 6, 2020	The New Mutants	US$160,090	
37	September 13, 2020	After We Collided	US$312,959	
38	September 20, 2020	After We Collided	US$312,959	
39	September 27, 2020	Trouble	US$78,614	
40	October 4, 2020	Trouble	US$85,682	
41	October 11, 2020	Greenland	US$324,000	
42	October 18, 2020	Greenland	US$251,000	
43	October 25, 2020	Six Minutes to Midnight	US$39,201	
44	November 1, 2020	The Witches	US$390,000	
45	November 8, 2020	Spanish cinemas closed and box office reporting suspended due to the COVID-19 pandemic		
46	November 15, 2020	Spanish cinemas closed and box office reporting suspended due to the COVID-19 pandemic		
47	November 22, 2020	The Call of the Wild	US$33	
48	November 29, 2020	Spanish cinemas closed and box office reporting suspended due to the COVID-19 pandemic		
49	December 6, 2020	Trolls World Tour	US$133,865	
50	December 13, 2020	The Turning	US$81,578	
51	December 20, 2020	Wonder Woman 1984	US$1,103,212	
52	December 27, 2020	Trolls World Tour	US$41,809	

== Highest-grossing films ==
Highest-grossing films of 2020
Rank	Title	Distributor	Domestic gross (€)
1	Padre no hay más que uno 2: La llegada de la suegra	Sony	10,554,851
2	1917	Entertainment One	9,255,893
3	Tenet	Warner Bros.	6,346,407
4	Bad Boys for Life	Sony	6,336,896
5	Adú	Paramount	6,106,114
6	Parasite	La Aventura del cine	6,098,528
7	Dolittle	Universal	6,042,218
8	Sonic the Hedgehog	Paramount	4,925,665
9	Star Wars: The Rise of Skywalker	Disney	4,736,615
10	Jumanji: The Next Level	Sony	4,587,705

== See also ==
- List of Spanish films — Spanish films by year
