= List of 2022 box office number-one films in Spain =

This is a list of films which placed number one at the weekend box office for the year 2022 in Spain.

== Number-one films ==
†	This implies the highest-grossing movie of the year.

#	Date	Film	Gross	Notes	Ref
1	January 2, 2022	Spider-Man: No Way Home	€1,495,768	It was Spider-Man: No Way Home third weekend at the top spot.	
2	January 9, 2022	Spider-Man: No Way Home	€1,499,000		
3	January 16, 2022	Spider-Man: No Way Home	€841,264		
4	January 23, 2022	Spider-Man: No Way Home	€656,572		
5	January 30, 2022	Spider-Man: No Way Home	€526,688		
6	February 6, 2022	Moonfall	€531,488	Moonfall had the lowest number-one weekend debut of 2022.	
7	February 13, 2022	Uncharted	€3,084,500		
8	February 20, 2022	Uncharted	€1,953,400		
9	February 27, 2022	Uncharted	€1,430,000		
10	March 6, 2022	The Batman	€3,404,618		
11	March 13, 2022	The Batman	€1,969,435		
12	March 20, 2022	The Bad Guys	€1,672,132		
13	March 27, 2022	The Bad Guys	€1,299,996		
14	April 3, 2022	Sonic the Hedgehog 2	€2,040,201		
15	April 10, 2022	Fantastic Beasts: The Secrets of Dumbledore	€2,645,022		
16	April 17, 2022	Fantastic Beasts: The Secrets of Dumbledore	€1,101,307		
17	April 24, 2022	The Northman	€802,311		
18	May 1, 2022	The Northman	€475,791	The second weekend of The Northman had the lowest number-one weekend of 2022.	
19	May 8, 2022	Doctor Strange in the Multiverse of Madness	€5,650,000		
20	May 15, 2022	Doctor Strange in the Multiverse of Madness	€1,864,981		
21	May 22, 2022	Doctor Strange in the Multiverse of Madness	€936,988		
22	May 29, 2022	Top Gun: Maverick	€1,638,067		
23	June 5, 2022	Top Gun: Maverick	€1,420,181		
24	June 12, 2022	Jurassic World Dominion	€4,676,337		
25	June 19, 2022	Jurassic World Dominion	€2,268,662		
26	June 26, 2022	Jurassic World Dominion	€1,632,650		
27	July 3, 2022	Minions: The Rise of Gru	€3,571,849		
28	July 10, 2022	Thor: Love and Thunder	€3,461,000		
29	July 17, 2022	Father There Is Only One 3	€2,414,000	Father There Is Only One 3 was the first of four Spanish films to reach number one in 2022.	
30	July 24, 2022	Father There Is Only One 3	€1,400,000		
31	July 31, 2022	Father There Is Only One 3	€952,000		
32	August 7, 2022	Bullet Train	€1,396,000		
33	August 14, 2022	Bullet Train	€866,000		
34	August 21, 2022	Bullet Train	€538,000		
35	August 28, 2022	Tad, the Lost Explorer and the Emerald Tablet	€2,211,587	Tad the Lost Explorer and the Curse of the Mummy was the second of four Spanish films to reach number one in 2022.	
36	September 4, 2022	Tad, the Lost Explorer and the Emerald Tablet	€1,372,855		
37	September 11, 2022	Ticket to Paradise	€851,138		
38	September 18, 2022	Tad, the Lost Explorer and the Emerald Tablet	€676,000	Tad the Lost Explorer and the Curse of the Mummy reclaimed the number-one spot in its fourth weekend of release.	
39	September 25, 2022	Tad, the Lost Explorer and the Emerald Tablet	€631,653		
40	October 2, 2022	Avatar	€988,927	2009 film re-release	
41	October 9, 2022	Smile	€859,974	Smile reached the number-one spot in its second weekend of release.	
42	October 16, 2022	God's Crooked Lines	€683,783	God's Crooked Lines reached the number-one spot in its second weekend of release. It was also the third of four Spanish films to reach number one in 2022.	
43	October 23, 2022	Black Adam	€2,176,675		
44	October 30, 2022	Black Adam	€1,194,976		
45	November 6, 2022	Black Adam	€737,787		
46	November 13, 2022	Black Panther: Wakanda Forever	€2,835,432		
47	November 20, 2022	Black Panther: Wakanda Forever	€1,314,717		
48	November 27, 2022	Strange World	€640,000		
49	December 4, 2022	The Kids Are Alright 2	€929,433	The Kids Are Alright 2 was the fourth of four Spanish films to reach number one in 2022.	
50	December 11, 2022	The Kids Are Alright 2	€806,316		
51	December 18, 2022	Avatar: The Way of Water †	€7,526,000	Avatar: The Way of Water had the highest number-one weekend and debut of 2022.	
52	December 25, 2022	Avatar: The Way of Water †	€3,624,648		
53	December 30, 2022 to January 1, 2023	Avatar: The Way of Water †	€3,010,535	The weekend started in 2022 and ended in 2023.	

== Highest-grossing films ==
=== In-year release ===
Highest-grossing films of 2022 by in-year release
Rank	Title	Distributor	Domestic gross
1	Avatar: The Way of Water	20th Century Studios	€26,760,500
2	Minions: The Rise of Gru	Universal	€20,748,264
3	Jurassic World: Dominion	Universal	€18,086,662
4	Father There Is Only One 3	Sony	€15,606,842
5	Doctor Strange in the Multiverse of Madness	Disney	€13,123,078
6	Uncharted	Sony	€12,208,041
7	Tad, the Lost Explorer and the Emerald Tablet	Paramount	€11,774,938
8	Thor: Love and Thunder	Disney	€11,585,390
9	The Batman	Warner Bros.	€10,793,264
10	Top Gun: Maverick	Paramount	€10,555,883

== See also ==
- List of Spanish films — Spanish films by year
- List of Spanish films of 2023
- List of 2023 box office number-one films in Spain
