= List of 2012 box office number-one films in Spain =

This is a list of films which placed number one at the weekend box office for the year 2012 in Spain.

== Number-one films ==
†	This implies the highest-grossing movie of the year.

#	Date	Film	Gross in euros	Gross in US dollars	Notes
1	January 8, 2012	Sherlock Holmes: A Game of Shadows	€3,158,211	$4,018,642	
2	January 15, 2012	Sherlock Holmes: A Game of Shadows	€1,635,152	$2,074,329	
3	January 22, 2012	The Descendants	€2,109,677	$2,729,489	
4	January 29, 2012	The Descendants	€1,672,291	$2,211,616	
5	February 5, 2012	The Descendants	€1,135,914	$1,495,116	
6	February 12, 2012	Safe House	€1,744,303	$2,302,741	
7	February 19, 2012	Journey 2: The Mysterious Island	€1,590,037	$2,090,641	
8	February 26, 2012	Hugo	€1,692,256	$2,277,231	
9	March 4, 2012	Hugo	€1,374,014	$1,814,167	
10	March 11, 2012	John Carter	€2,072,340	$2,720,677	
11	March 18, 2012	Intouchables	€1,605,018	$2,115,484	Intouchables reached the number-one spot in its second weekend of release.
12	March 25, 2012	Intouchables	€1,391,091	$1,846,638	
13	April 1, 2012	Wrath of the Titans	€1,985,102	$2,649,593	
14	April 8, 2012	The Lorax	€1,649,061	$2,160,295	The Lorax reached the number-one spot in its second weekend of release.
15	April 15, 2012	Battleship	€2,149,061	$2,811,693	
16	April 22, 2012	The Hunger Games	€3,002,077	$3,969,794	
17	April 29, 2012	The Avengers	€5,328,411	$7,065,265	
18	May 6, 2012	The Avengers	€2,312,457	$3,026,697	
19	May 13, 2012	Dark Shadows	€1,920,091	$2,481,315	
20	May 20, 2012	Dark Shadows	€1,435,375	$1,834,462	
21	May 27, 2012	Men in Black 3	€2,325,945	$2,913,112	
22	June 3, 2012	Snow White and the Huntsman	€3,187,432	$3,964,961	
23	June 10, 2012	Snow White and the Huntsman	€1,511,648	$1,892,257	
24	June 17, 2012	Snow White and the Huntsman	€879,998	$1,112,612	The third weekend of Snow White and the Huntsman was the lowest number-one weekend of 2012
25	June 24, 2012	Tengo ganas de ti	€3,032,742	$3,813,618	Tengo ganas de ti was the first Spanish film to reach number one in 2012.
26	July 1, 2012	Ice Age: Continental Drift	€2,741,279	$3,473,095	
27	July 8, 2012	The Amazing Spider-Man	€3,276,776	$4,026,809	
28	July 15, 2012	The Dictator	€1,522,034	$1,864,758	
29	July 22, 2012	The Dark Knight Rises	€3,562,647	$4,330,748	
30	July 29, 2012	Madagascar 3: Europe's Most Wanted	€2,115,895	$2,607,323	
31	August 5, 2012	Prometheus	€3,392,538	$4,202,951	
32	August 12, 2012	Brave	€2,566,524	$3,154,605	
33	August 19, 2012	Brave	€1,449,249	$1,787,828	
34	August 26, 2012	The Expendables 2	€1,903,692	$2,382,384	
35	September 2, 2012	Las aventuras de Tadeo Jones	€2,873,462	$3,614,372	Las aventuras de Tadeo Jones was the second Spanish film to reach number one in 2012.
36	September 9, 2012	Las aventuras de Tadeo Jones	€1,922,411	$2,464,250	
37	September 16, 2012	Las aventuras de Tadeo Jones	€1,486,918	$1,952,438	
38	September 23, 2012	Las aventuras de Tadeo Jones	€1,408,840	$1,829,045	
39	September 30, 2012	Las aventuras de Tadeo Jones	€1,369,433	$1,761,147	
40	October 7, 2012	Resident Evil: Retribution	€1,078,479	$1,406,486	Resident Evil: Retribution had the lowest number-one weekend debut of 2012
41	October 14, 2012	The Impossible †	€8,930,116	$11,569,306	The Impossible was the third Spanish film to reach number one in 2015.
42	October 21, 2012	The Impossible †	€6,921,092	$9,016,065	
43	October 28, 2012	The Impossible †	€4,457,768	$5,768,184	
44	November 4, 2012	The Impossible †	€3,612,473	$4,638,512	
45	November 11, 2012	The Impossible †	€2,209,611	$2,809,459	
46	November 18, 2012	The Twilight Saga: Breaking Dawn – Part 2	€9,355,116	$11,923,269	The Twilight Saga: Breaking Dawn – Part 2 had the highest weekend debut of 2012.
47	November 25, 2012	The Twilight Saga: Breaking Dawn – Part 2	€3,629,927	$4,710,948	
48	December 2, 2012	Life of Pi	€1,812,018	$2,353,454	
49	December 9, 2012	Life of Pi	€1,602,237	$2,071,653	
50	December 16, 2012	The Hobbit: An Unexpected Journey	€6,012,611	$7,915,913	
51	December 23, 2012	The Hobbit: An Unexpected Journey	€3,621,646	$4,776,700	
52	December 30, 2012	The Hobbit: An Unexpected Journey	€2,504,132	$3,310,023	

== Highest-grossing films ==
Highest-grossing films of 2012
Rank	Title	Distributor	Director(s)	Release	Country	Domestic Gross
1.	The Impossible	Warner Bros.	Juan Antonio Bayona	October 11	Spain; United States	$54,536,668
2.	The Twilight Saga: Breaking Dawn – Part 2	Aurum	Bill Condon	November 16	United States	$31,266,098
3.	The Hobbit: An Unexpected Journey	Warner Bros.	Peter Jackson	December 14	New Zealand; United States	$30,138,682
4.	Las aventuras de Tadeo Jones	Paramount	Enrique Gato	August 31	Spain	$23,871,402
5.	Intouchables	A Contracorriente Films	Éric Toledano and Olivier Nakache	March 9	France	$21,053,638
6.	The Avengers	Disney	Joss Whedon	April 27	United States	$20,220,212
7.	Ice Age: Continental Drift	Fox	Steve Martino & Michael Thurmeier	June 29	United States	$19,602,661
8.	Brave	Disney	Mark Andrews & Brenda Chapman	August 10	United States	$18,877,186
9.	Tengo ganas de ti	Warner Bros.	Fernando González Molina	June 22	Spain	$15,718,869
10.	The Dark Knight Rises	Warner Bros	Christopher Nolan	July 20	United Kingdom; United States	$15,394,652

== See also ==
- List of Spanish films — Spanish films by year
