= List of 2011 box office number-one films in Spain =

This is a list of films which have placed number one at the weekend box office in Spain during 2011.

== Number-one films ==
| † | This implies the highest-grossing movie of the year. |

| # | Date | Film | Gross in euros | Gross in US dollars | Notes |
|---|---|---|---|---|---|
| 1 | January 2, 2011 | The Tourist | €2,499,922 | $3,346,482 | |
| 2 | January 9, 2011 | The Tourist | €1,506,072 | $1,944,724 | |
| 3 | January 16, 2011 | Love & Other Drugs | €909,247 | $1,217,589 | |
| 4 | January 23, 2011 | Hereafter | €2,754,330 | $3,752,186 | |
| 5 | January 30, 2011 | Hereafter | €1,914,087 | $2,606,257 | |
| 6 | February 6, 2011 | Tangled | €4,199,787 | $5,705,845 | |
| 7 | February 13, 2011 | Tangled | €3,397,012 | $4,605,057 | |
| 8 | February 20, 2011 | Black Swan | €2,147,588 | $2,941,780 | |
| 9 | February 27, 2011 | Black Swan | €1,832,161 | $2,520,721 | |
| 10 | March 6, 2011 | Rango | €1,430,027 | $2,000,177 | |
| 11 | March 13, 2011 | Torrente 4: Lethal Crisis † | €8,328,422 | $11,583,179 | Torrente 4: Lethal Crisis was the first and only Spanish film to reach number one in 2011. |
| 12 | March 20, 2011 | Torrente 4: Lethal Crisis † | €3,657,484 | $5,188,804 | |
| 13 | March 27, 2011 | Torrente 4: Lethal Crisis † | €1,989,510 | $2,803,706 | |
| 14 | April 3, 2011 | Battle: Los Angeles | €1,909,529 | $2,719,623 | |
| 15 | April 10, 2011 | Rio | €1,505,212 | $2,180,392 | |
| 16 | April 17, 2011 | Rio | €980,153 | $1,414,873 | |
| 17 | April 24, 2011 | Rio | €1,829,486 | $2,665,024 | |
| 18 | May 1, 2011 | Fast Five | €4,458,914 | $6,604,527 | |
| 19 | May 8, 2011 | Fast Five | €1,804,303 | $2,583,592 | |
| 20 | May 15, 2011 | Midnight in Paris | €1,048,445 | $1,480,750 | |
| 21 | May 22, 2011 | Pirates of the Caribbean: On Stranger Tides | €6,706,400 | $9,497,132 | |
| 22 | May 29, 2011 | Pirates of the Caribbean: On Stranger Tides | €3,265,748 | $4,677,382 | |
| 23 | June 5, 2011 | Pirates of the Caribbean: On Stranger Tides | €2,250,950 | $3,295,440 | |
| 24 | June 12, 2011 | Insidious | €1,542,470 | $2,213,743 | |
| 25 | June 19, 2011 | Kung Fu Panda 2 | €2,155,672 | $3,085,393 | |
| 26 | June 26, 2011 | The Hangover Part II | €1,824,861 | $2,589,998 | |
| 27 | July 3, 2011 | Transformers: Dark of the Moon | €2,513,485 | $3,652,153 | |
| 28 | July 10, 2011 | Cars 2 | €2,520,009 | $3,595,185 | |
| 29 | July 17, 2011 | Harry Potter and the Deathly Hallows – Part 2 | €6,052,868 | $8,573,832 | |
| 30 | July 24, 2011 | Harry Potter and the Deathly Hallows – Part 2 | €1,876,730 | $2,695,870 | |
| 31 | July 31, 2011 | The Smurfs | €2,485,456 | $3,579,286 | |
| 32 | August 7, 2011 | Rise of the Planet of the Apes | €3,503,763 | $5,011,820 | |
| 33 | August 14, 2011 | Rise of the Planet of the Apes | €1,667,962 | $2,377,437 | |
| 34 | August 21, 2011 | Super 8 | €2,818,993 | $4,059,610 | |
| 35 | August 28, 2011 | Super 8 | €1,885,309 | $2,734,472 | |
| 36 | September 4, 2011 | Cowboys & Aliens | €1,523,438 | $2,164,897 | |
| 37 | September 11, 2011 | The Debt | €1,003,723 | $1,370,738 | |
| 38 | September 18, 2011 | The Tree of Life | €976,871 | $1,348,618 | |
| 39 | September 25, 2011 | Friends with Benefits | €1,466,445 | $1,980,665 | |
| 40 | October 2, 2011 | Johnny English Reborn | €1,447,024 | $1,937,892 | |
| 41 | October 9, 2011 | Intruders | €1,092,239 | $1,461,639 | |
| 42 | October 16, 2011 | Contagion | €1,040,681 | $1,445,130 | |
| 43 | October 23, 2011 | Paranormal Activity 3 | €712,193 | $989,954 | Paranormal Activity 3 had the lowest number-one weekend debut of 2011. |
| 44 | October 30, 2011 | The Adventures of Tintin: The Secret of the Unicorn | €2,648,062 | $3,747,929 | |
| 45 | November 6, 2011 | The Adventures of Tintin: The Secret of the Unicorn | €3,755,871 | $5,180,940 | |
| 46 | November 13, 2011 | The Adventures of Tintin: The Secret of the Unicorn | €2,043,322 | $2,810,776 | |
| 47 | November 20, 2011 | The Twilight Saga: Breaking Dawn – Part 1 | €8,714,957 | $11,791,788 | The Twilight Saga: Breaking Dawn – Part 1 had the highest weekend debut of 2011. |
| 48 | November 27, 2011 | Puss in Boots | €4,126,965 | $5,465,962 | |
| 49 | December 4, 2011 | Puss in Boots | €2,478,405 | $3,320,879 | |
| 50 | December 11, 2011 | Puss in Boots | €1,631,128 | $2,184,420 | |
| 51 | December 18, 2011 | Mission: Impossible – Ghost Protocol | €2,023,994 | $2,640,945 | |
| 52 | December 25, 2011 | Immortals | €1,540,759 | $2,010,437 | |
| 53 | January 1, 2012 | Immortals | €795,627 | $1,031,674 | |

== Highest-grossing films ==
Highest-grossing films of 2011
| Rank | Title | Distributor | Director(s) | Release | Country | Domestic Gross |
|---|---|---|---|---|---|---|
| 1. | Torrente 4: Lethal Crisis | Warner Bros. | Santiago Segura | March 11 | Spain | $29,031,125 |
| 2. | Pirates of the Caribbean: On Stranger Tides | Disney | Rob Marshall | May 20 | United States | $27,122,003 |
| 3. | The Twilight Saga: Breaking Dawn – Part 1 | Aurum | Bill Condon | November 18 | United States | $26,146,033 |
| 4. | Harry Potter and the Deathly Hallows – Part 2 | Warner Bros. | David Yates | July 15 | United Kingdom; United States | $21,887,869 |
| 5. | Puss in Boots | Paramount | Chris Miller | November 25 | United States | $20,653,981 |
| 6. | Tangled | Disney | Nathan Greno & Byron Howard | February 4 | United States | $19,948,977 |
| 7. | The Smurfs | Sony | Raja Gosnell | July 29 | United States; Belgium | $19,530,655 |
| 8. | Rise of the Planet of the Apes | Fox | Rupert Wyatt | August 5 | United States | $19,411,178 |
| 9. | Fast Five | Universal | Justin Lin | April 29 | United States | $14,498,253 |
| 10. | Black Swan | Fox | Darren Aronofsky | February 18 | United States | $14,463,540 |

== See also ==
- List of Spanish films — Spanish films by year
