= List of 2014 box office number-one films in Spain =

This is a list of films which placed number one at the weekend box office for the year 2014 in Spain.

== Number-one films ==
†	This implies the highest-grossing movie of the year.

#	Date	Film	Gross in euros	Gross in US dollars	Notes
1	January 5, 2014	The Hobbit: The Desolation of Smaug	€937,274	$1,273,833	It was The Hobbit: The Desolation of Smaug's fourth week at number one.
2	January 12, 2014	The Book Thief	€900,831	$1,231,636	
3	January 19, 2014	The Wolf of Wall Street	€2,675,772	$3,623,645	
4	January 26, 2014	The Wolf of Wall Street	€2,217,348	$3,033,598	
5	February 2, 2014	American Hustle	€1,499,940	$2,023,364	
6	February 9, 2014	The Lego Movie	€1,498,520	$2,043,473	
7	February 16, 2014	The Lego Movie	€1,038,007	$1,421,577	
8	February 23, 2014	The Monuments Men	€1,365,395	$1,876,574	
9	March 2, 2014	The Monuments Men	€844,616	$1,166,113	
10	March 9, 2014	300: Rise of an Empire	€2,713,946	$3,767,434	
11	March 16, 2014	Ocho apellidos vascos †	€2,839,271	$3,950,840	Ocho apellidos vascos was the first Spanish film to reach number one in 2014.
12	March 23, 2014	Ocho apellidos vascos †	€4,456,456	$6,147,175	
13	March 30, 2014	Ocho apellidos vascos †	€5,504,054	$7,570,184	The third weekend of Ocho apellidos vascos had the highest number-one weekend of 2015.
14	April 6, 2014	Ocho apellidos vascos †	€5,219,530	$7,154,451	
15	April 13, 2014	Ocho apellidos vascos †	€4,127,024	$5,731,102	
16	April 20, 2014	Ocho apellidos vascos †	€4,446,223	$6,143,822	
17	April 27, 2014	Ocho apellidos vascos †	€3,405,118	$4,710,815	Ocho apellidos vascos became the highest-grossing Spanish film of all time.
18	May 4, 2014	Ocho apellidos vascos †	€2,689,884	$3,733,047	
19	May 11, 2014	Ocho apellidos vascos †	€1,256,109	$1,728,701	
20	May 18, 2014	Godzilla	€938,729	$1,285,578	
21	May 25, 2014	Godzilla	€463,614	$632,195	
22	June 1, 2014	Maleficent	€3,146,954	$4,291,789	
23	June 8, 2014	X-Men: Days of Future Past	€1,972,407	$2,691,199	
24	June 15, 2014	Maleficent	€843,504	$1,142,758	Maleficent reclaimed the number-one spot in its third weekend of release.
25	June 22, 2014	Maleficent	€642,739	$874,213	
26	June 29, 2014	The Pirate Fairy	€533,532	$728,322	The Pirate Fairy had the lowest weekend debut of 2014.
27	July 6, 2014	The Fault in Our Stars	€633,451	$861,370	
28	July 13, 2014	The Fault in Our Stars	€303,232	$412,780	The second weekend of The Fault in Our Stars had the lowest number-one weekend of 2014.
29	July 20, 2014	Dawn of the Planet of the Apes	€3,333,878	$4,509,079	
30	July 27, 2014	Dawn of the Planet of the Apes	€1,628,892	$2,187,900	
31	August 3, 2014	How to Train Your Dragon 2	€2,108,539	$2,832,916	
32	August 10, 2014	Transformers: Age of Extinction	€1,976,446	$2,651,310	
33	August 17, 2014	Guardians of the Galaxy	€1,660,836	$2,226,322	
34	August 24, 2014	Lucy	€2,508,567	$3,322,737	
35	August 31, 2014	El Niño	€2,847,500	$3,740,607	El Niño was the second Spanish film to reach number one in 2014.
36	September 7, 2014	El Niño	€2,147,368	$2,781,637	
37	September 14, 2014	El Niño	€1,620,863	$2,101,523	
38	September 21, 2014	The Maze Runner	€1,438,343	$1,845,473	
39	September 28, 2014	The Maze Runner	€1,043,670	$1,324,354	
40	October 5, 2014	Torrente 5: Operación Eurovegas	€3,714,085	$4,648,533	Torrente 5: Operación Eurovegas was the third Spanish film to reach number one in 2014.
41	October 12, 2014	Torrente 5: Operación Eurovegas	€1,966,947	$2,484,774	
42	October 19, 2014	Teenage Mutant Ninja Turtles	€1,144,410	$1,460,433	
43	October 26, 2014	Dracula Untold	€1,466,943	$1,859,125	
44	November 2, 2014	Dracula Untold	€1,024,588	$1,283,479	
45	November 9, 2014	Interstellar	€2,151,702	$2,680,414	
46	November 16, 2014	Interstellar	€1,576,457	$1,975,015	
47	November 23, 2014	The Hunger Games: Mockingjay – Part 1	€4,214,948	$5,225,250	
48	November 30, 2014	The Hunger Games: Mockingjay – Part 1	€2,391,000	$2,975,980	
49	December 7, 2014	Exodus: Gods and Kings	€3,202,207	$3,935,849	Exodus: Gods and Kings, a Spanish co-production, reached number one in 2014.
50	December 14, 2014	Exodus: Gods and Kings	€1,359,203	$1,694,133	
51	December 21, 2014	The Hobbit: The Battle of the Five Armies	€5,347,043	$6,539,605	The Hobbit: The Battle of the Five Armies had the highest weekend debut of 2014.
52	December 28, 2014	The Hobbit: The Battle of the Five Armies	€2,734,428	$3,331,662	

== Highest-grossing films ==
Highest-grossing films of 2014
Rank	Title	Distributor	Director(s)	Release	Country	Domestic Gross
1.	Ocho apellidos vascos	Universal	Emilio Martínez-Lázaro	March 14	Spain	$77,460,837
2.	El Niño	Fox	Daniel Monzón	August 29	Spain; France	$20,917,739
3.	Big Hero 6	Disney	Don Hall & Chris Williams	December 12	United States	$18,460,857
4.	Exodus: Gods and Kings	Fox	Ridley Scott	December 5	United States; United Kingdom; Spain	$18,107,577
5.	Dawn of the Planet of the Apes	Fox	Matt Reeves	July 18	United States	$17,324,221
6.	Maleficent	Disney	Robert Stromberg	May 30	United States	$17,180,614
7.	The Wolf of Wall Street	Universal	Martin Scorsese	January 17	United States	$16,461,083
8.	The Hunger Games: Mockingjay – Part 1	eOne	Francis Lawrence	November 21	United States	$15,391,282
9.	The Hobbit: The Battle of the Five Armies	Warner Bros.	Peter Jackson	December 17	New Zealand; United States	$13,650,942
10.	Torrente 5: Operación Eurovegas	Sony	Santiago Segura	October 3	Spain	$13,580,332

== See also ==
- List of Spanish films — Spanish films by year
