= List of 2008 box office number-one films in Spain =

This is a list of films which have placed number one at the weekend box office in Spain during 2008.

== Number-one films ==
| † | This implies the highest-grossing movie of the year. |

| # | Date | Film | Gross in euros | Gross in US dollars | Notes |
|---|---|---|---|---|---|
| 1 | January 6, 2008 | American Gangster (2) | | $2,015,633 | |
| 2 | January 13, 2008 | Aliens vs. Predator: Requiem | | $2,356,965 | |
| 3 | January 20, 2008 | The Oxford Murders † | | $3,270,522 | |
| 4 | January 27, 2008 | Mortadelo y Filemón. Misión: salvar la Tierra | | $4,257,686 | |
| 5 | February 3, 2008 | Mortadelo y Filemón. Misión: salvar la Tierra | | $2,673,965 | |
| 6 | February 10, 2008 | Astérix aux Jeux Olympiques | | $2,797,276 | |
| 7 | February 17, 2008 | Jumper | | $3,779,660 | |
| 8 | February 24, 2008 | Jumper | | $2,248,675 | |
| 9 | March 2, 2008 | Vantage Point | | $2,210,389 | |
| 10 | March 9, 2008 | 10,000 BC | | $4,541,070 | |
| 11 | March 16, 2008 | 10,000 BC | €1,350,611 | $2,116,282 | |
| 12 | March 23, 2008 | Horton Hears a Who! | €1,652,835 | $2,550,278 | Horton Hears a Who! reached #1 in its second weekend of release |
| 13 | March 30, 2008 | Meet the Spartans | €1,878,601 | $2,966,369 | |
| 14 | April 6, 2008 | Meet the Spartans | €1,025,645 | $1,613,665 | |
| 15 | April 13, 2008 | 21 | €1,204,500 | $1,903,445 | |
| 16 | April 20, 2008 | 21 | €893,787 | $1,413,325 | |
| 17 | April 27, 2008 | Street Kings | €695,768 | $1,087,138 | Street Kings had the lowest weekend debut of 2008. |
| 18 | May 4, 2008 | Iron Man | €2,184,427 | $3,368,430 | |
| 19 | May 11, 2008 | What Happens in Vegas | €2,443,672 | $3,782,188 | |
| 20 | May 18, 2008 | What Happens in Vegas | €1,491,594 | $2,322,631 | |
| 21 | May 25, 2008 | Indiana Jones and the Kingdom of the Crystal Skull | €6,908,963 | $10,887,115 | Indiana Jones and the Kingdom of the Crystal Skull had the highest weekend debut of 2008. |
| 22 | June 1, 2008 | Indiana Jones and the Kingdom of the Crystal Skull | €4,041,919 | $6,285,055 | |
| 23 | June 8, 2008 | Indiana Jones and the Kingdom of the Crystal Skull | €1,840,772 | $2,896,117 | |
| 24 | June 15, 2008 | The Happening | €2,235,325 | $3,436,846 | |
| 25 | June 22, 2008 | The Incredible Hulk | €1,419,385 | $2,214,674 | |
| 26 | June 29, 2008 | The Incredible Hulk | €781,730 | $1,234,376 | |
| 27 | July 6, 2008 | The Chronicles of Narnia: Prince Caspian | €2,699,903 | $4,239,797 | |
| 28 | July 13, 2008 | Kung Fu Panda | €3,928,838 | $6,259,101 | |
| 29 | July 20, 2008 | Hancock | €5,820,811 | $6,259,101 | |
| 30 | July 27, 2008 | Hancock | €2,557,897 | $4,016,798 | |
| 31 | August 3, 2008 | The Mummy: Tomb of the Dragon Emperor | €4,160,091 | $6,472,835 | |
| 32 | August 10, 2008 | WALL-E | €2,133,483 | $3,200,544 | |
| 33 | August 17, 2008 | The Dark Knight | €3,016,685 | $4,429,137 | |
| 34 | August 24, 2008 | You Don't Mess with the Zohan | €2,303,052 | $3,405,371 | |
| 35 | August 31, 2008 | Hellboy II: The Golden Army | €2,096,889 | $3,075,970 | |
| 36 | September 7, 2008 | The Argentine (Che: Part One) | €1,900,659 | $2,710,581 | |
| 37 | September 14, 2008 | Wanted | €2,269,313 | $3,227,582 | |
| 38 | September 21, 2008 | Vicky Cristina Barcelona | €2,237,385 | $3,235,553 | |
| 39 | September 28, 2008 | The Boy in the Striped Pyjamas | €2,223,937 | $3,248,520 | |
| 40 | October 5, 2008 | The Boy in the Striped Pyjamas | €1,724,700 | $2,374,965 | |
| 41 | October 12, 2008 | Burn After Reading | €1,998,042 | $2,675,830 | |
| 42 | October 19, 2008 | Burn After Reading | €1,313,618 | $1,760,646 | |
| 43 | October 26, 2008 | High School Musical 3: Senior Year | $5,649,631 | $5,649,631 | |
| 44 | November 2, 2008 | High School Musical 3: Senior Year | €1,975,203 | $2,512,022 | |
| 45 | November 9, 2008 | Body of Lies | €1,788,950 | $2,274,282 | |
| 46 | November 16, 2008 | Saw V | €2,230,353 | $2,815,036 | |
| 47 | November 23, 2008 | Quantum of Solace | €4,087,796 | $5,142,528 | |
| 48 | November 30, 2008 | Madagascar: Escape 2 Africa | €4,561,296 | $5,786,978 | |
| 49 | December 7, 2008 | Twilight | €3,915,914 | $4,978,279 | |
| 50 | December 14, 2008 | The Day the Earth Stood Still | €2,134,031 | $2,856,420 | |
| 51 | December 21, 2008 | Changeling | €1,402,203 | $1,949,941 | |
| 52 | December 28, 2008 | Australia | €2,286,108 | $3,178,682 | |

== See also ==
- List of Spanish films — Spanish films by year
