= List of 2016 box office number-one films in Spain =

This is a list of films which placed number one at the weekend box office for the year 2016 in Spain.

== Number-one films ==
†	This implies the highest-grossing movie of the year.

#	Date	Film	Gross in euros	Gross in US dollars	Notes
1	January 3, 2016	Star Wars: The Force Awakens	€3,256,017	$3,539,572	It was Star Wars: The Force Awakens' third week at number one.
2	January 10, 2016	Palmeras en la nieve	€1,924,525	$2,191,368	Palmeras en la nieve reached the number-one spot in its third weekend of release. It was the first Spanish film to reach number one in 2016.
3	January 17, 2016	The Hateful Eight	€1,808,119	$2,056,737	
4	January 24, 2016	Alvin and the Chipmunks: The Road Chip	€1,179,972	$1,274,364	Alvin and the Chipmunks: The Road Chip had the lowest number-one weekend debut of 2016.
5	January 31, 2016	Creed	€1,506,848	$1,632,378	
6	February 7, 2016	The Revenant	€3,700,349	$4,096,572	
7	February 14, 2016	Zootopia	€2,765,013	$3,113,087	
8	February 21, 2016	Deadpool	€3,514,862	$3,913,185	
9	February 28, 2016	Deadpool	€1,872,906	$2,048,347	
10	March 6, 2016	To Steal from a Thief	€1,587,224	$1,747,601	Cien años de perdón was the second Spanish film to reach number one in 2016.
11	March 13, 2016	The Divergent Series: Allegiant	€1,477,070	$1,647,247	
12	March 20, 2016	Kung Fu Panda 3	€1,122,770	$1,265,692	Kung Fu Panda 3 reached the number-one spot in its second weekend of release.
13	March 27, 2016	Batman v Superman: Dawn of Justice	€2,848,614	$3,182,560	
14	April 3, 2016	Batman v Superman: Dawn of Justice	€1,298,866	$1,480,274	
15	April 10, 2016	The Huntsman: Winter's War	€1,245,499	$1,418,767	
16	April 17, 2016	The Jungle Book	€3,879,566	$4,379,435	
17	April 24, 2016	The Jungle Book	€2,798,835	$3,142,957	
18	May 1, 2016	Captain America: Civil War	€3,714,416	$4,254,431	
19	May 8, 2016	Captain America: Civil War	€1,666,136	$1,900,398	
20	May 15, 2016	The Angry Birds Movie	€1,717,599	$1,943,139	
21	May 22, 2016	X-Men: Apocalypse	€1,662,315	$1,866,155	
22	May 29, 2016	Alice Through the Looking Glass	€1,248,177	$1,387,557	
23	June 5, 2016	Warcraft	€2,222,931	$2,527,120	
24	June 12, 2016	Warcraft	€850,324	$956,915	
25	June 19, 2016	The Conjuring 2	€1,547,142	$1,745,245	
26	June 26, 2016	Finding Dory	€2,895,425	$3,219,321	
27	July 3, 2016	Finding Dory	€1,877,794	$2,093,439	
28	July 10, 2016	Finding Dory	€1,199,241	$1,325,729	
29	July 17, 2016	Ice Age: Collision Course	€1,339,238	$1,478,563	
30	July 24, 2016	The Legend of Tarzan	€1,648,376	$1,810,149	
31	July 31, 2016	Jason Bourne	€1,665,162	$1,861,577	
32	August 7, 2016	The Secret Life of Pets	€4,084,221	$4,529,920	
33	August 14, 2016	The Secret Life of Pets	€1,902,021	$2,124,000	
34	August 21, 2016	The Secret Life of Pets	€1,379,160	$1,562,610	
35	August 28, 2016	Cuerpo de élite	€1,266,503	$1,418,654	Cuerpo de élite was the third Spanish film to reach number one in 2016.
36	September 4, 2016	Ben-Hur	€1,006,062	$1,121,539	
37	September 11, 2016	Cuerpo de élite	€653,994	$726,160	Cuerpo de élite reclaimed the number-one spot in its third weekend of release. The third weekend of Cuerpo de élite had the lowest number-one weekend of 2016.
38	September 18, 2016	Bridget Jones's Baby	€1,440,270	$1,561,573	
39	September 25, 2016	The Magnificent Seven	€1,035,693	$1,159,349	
40	October 2, 2016	Miss Peregrine's Home for Peculiar Children	€1,804,361	$2,032,291	
41	October 9, 2016	A Monster Calls †	€3,224,899	$3,611,714	A Monster Calls was the fourth Spanish film to reach number one in 2016.
42	October 16, 2016	A Monster Calls †	€3,667,456	$4,024,422	
43	October 23, 2016	A Monster Calls †	€2,809,879	$3,059,637	
44	October 30, 2016	Doctor Strange	€1,938,843	$2,130,129	
45	November 6, 2016	Trolls	€1,735,350	$1,933,322	Trolls reached the number-one spot in its second weekend of release.
46	November 13, 2016	Trolls	€1,334,907	$1,449,253	
47	November 20, 2016	Fantastic Beasts and Where to Find Them	€4,159,319	$4,404,192	
48	November 27, 2016	Fantastic Beasts and Where to Find Them	€2,282,674	$2,418,087	
49	December 4, 2016	Moana	€1,793,947	$1,913,543	
50	December 11, 2016	Moana	€1,361,673	$1,438,032	
51	December 18, 2016	Rogue One: A Star Wars Story	€4,523,952	$4,728,211	Rogue One: A Star Wars Story had the highest number-one weekend of 2016.
52	December 25, 2016	Sing	€1,965,654	$2,055,264	
53	January 1, 2017	Sing	€2,343,516	$2,465,302	

== Highest-grossing films ==
As of 7 April 2017

Highest-grossing films of 2016
Rank	Title	Distributor	Director(s)	Release	Country	Domestic Gross
1.	A Monster Calls	Universal	J.A. Bayona	October 7	Spain; United States	$28,167,834
2.	The Secret Life of Pets	Universal	Chris Renaud & Yarrow Cheney	August 5	United States	$22,835,481
3.	Finding Dory	Disney	Andrew Stanton	June 22	United States	$20,038,169
4.	The Jungle Book	Disney	Jon Favreau	April 15	United States	$19,385,604
5.	Sing	Universal	Garth Jennings	December 22	United States	$17,070,880
6.	Rogue One: A Star Wars Story	Disney	Gareth Edwards	December 16	United States	$16,684,795
7.	The Revenant	Fox	Alejandro González Iñárritu	February 19	United States	$16,142,025
8.	Zootopia	Disney	Byron Howard & Rich Moore	February 12	United States	$15,222,767
9.	Fantastic Beasts and Where to Find Them	Warner Bros.	David Yates	November 18	United Kingdom; United States	$14,398,289
10.	Suicide Squad	Warner Bros.	David Ayer	August 5	United States	$12,292,560

== See also ==
- List of Spanish films — Spanish films by year
