= List of 2021 box office number-one films in Spain =

This is a list of films which placed number one at the weekend box office for the year 2021 in Spain.

== Number-one films ==
†	This implies the highest-grossing movie of the year.

#	Date	Film	Gross	Notes	Ref
1	January 3, 2021	The Croods: A New Age	€787,446	It was The Croods: A New Age second weekend at the top spot.	
2	January 10, 2021	The Croods: A New Age	€206,753		
3	January 17, 2021	The Croods: A New Age	€145,538		
4	January 24, 2021	The Croods: A New Age	€106,205		
5	January 31, 2021	The Croods: A New Age	€73,130		
6	February 7, 2021	The Croods: A New Age	€67,876		
7	February 14, 2021	The Croods: A New Age	€59,935	The eighth weekend of The Croods: A New Age had the lowest number-one weekend of 2021.	
8	February 21, 2021	New Order	€71,699	New Order had the lowest number-one weekend debut of 2021.	
9	February 28, 2021	The Little Things	€124,757		
10	March 7, 2021	Raya and the Last Dragon	€257,626		
11	March 14, 2021	Raya and the Last Dragon	€200,300		
12	March 21, 2021	Raya and the Last Dragon	€212,104		
13	March 28, 2021	Godzilla vs. Kong	€1,470,940		
14	April 4, 2021	Godzilla vs. Kong	€1,197,172		
15	April 11, 2021	Godzilla vs. Kong	€621,713		
16	April 18, 2021	Mortal Kombat	€478,292		
17	April 25, 2021	Demon Slayer: Kimetsu no Yaiba – The Movie: Mugen Train	€550,970		
18	May 2, 2021	The Lord of the Rings: The Fellowship of the Ring	€314,206	2001 film re-release	
19	May 9, 2021	The Lord of the Rings: The Two Towers	€292,703	2002 film re-release	
20	May 16, 2021	The Lord of the Rings: The Return of the King	€289,511	2003 film re-release	
21	May 23, 2021	Spiral	€275,707		
22	May 30, 2021	Cruella	€666,244		
23	June 6, 2021	The Conjuring: The Devil Made Me Do It	€1,526,292		
24	June 13, 2021	The Conjuring: The Devil Made Me Do It	€832,411		
25	June 20, 2021	The Conjuring: The Devil Made Me Do It	€547,065		
26	June 27, 2021	Operación Camarón	€540,294	Operación Camarón was the first of only two Spanish films to reach number one in 2021.	
27	July 4, 2021	F9	€2,800,097		.
28	July 11, 2021	Black Widow	€1,633,024		
29	July 18, 2021	Black Widow	€731,478		
30	July 25, 2021	Space Jam: A New Legacy	€1,035,958		
31	August 1, 2021	Old	€1,064,112		
32	August 8, 2021	The Suicide Squad	€1,121,101		
33	August 15, 2021	The Suicide Squad	€559,042		
34	August 22, 2021	Free Guy	€509,933		
35	August 29, 2021	PAW Patrol: The Movie	€498,416		
36	September 5, 2021	Shang-Chi and the Legend of the Ten Rings	€1,518,763		
37	September 12, 2021	Shang-Chi and the Legend of the Ten Rings	€915,810		
38	September 19, 2021	Dune	€2,047,117		
39	September 26, 2021	Dune	€1,223,770		
40	October 3, 2021	No Time to Die	€2,183,770		
41	October 10, 2021	No Time to Die	€1,316,437		
42	October 17, 2021	Venom: Let There Be Carnage	€3,263,000		
43	October 24, 2021	Venom: Let There Be Carnage	€1,413,798		
44	October 31, 2021	Venom: Let There Be Carnage	€937,491		
45	November 7, 2021	Eternals	€2,586,082		
46	November 14, 2021	Way Down	€1,234,600	Way Down was the second of only two Spanish film to reach number one in 2021	
47	November 21, 2021	Way Down	€975,500		
48	November 28, 2021	Encanto	€1,520,495		
49	December 5, 2021	Ghostbusters: Afterlife	€1,114,000		
50	December 12, 2021	Encanto	€653,220	Encanto reclaimed the number-one spot in its third weekend of release.	
51	December 19, 2021	Spider-Man: No Way Home †	€7,290,760	Spider-Man: No Way Home had the highest number-one weekend of 2021.	
52	December 26, 2021	Spider-Man: No Way Home †	€2,470,000		

== Highest-grossing films ==
Highest-grossing films of 2021
Rank	Title	Distributor	Domestic gross	Ref.
1	Spider-Man: No Way Home	Sony	€28,434,415	
2	Sing 2	Universal	€9,546,151	
3	F9	Universal	€9,545,343	
4	Venom: Let There Be Carnage	Sony	€8,928,499	
5	The Kids Are Alright	Warner Bros.	€8,493,358	
6	Dune	Warner Bros.	€8,241,598	
7	No Time to Die	Universal	€7,994,968	
8	Eternals	Disney	€7,357,371	
9	Encanto	Disney	€7,189,995	
10	Godzilla vs. Kong	Warner Bros.	€6,347,373	

== See also ==
- List of Spanish films — Spanish films by year
