= List of 2019 box office number-one films in Spain =

This is a list of films which placed number one at the weekend box office for the year 2019 in Spain.

== Number-one films ==
†	This implies the highest-grossing movie of the year.

#	Date	Film	Gross in euros	Gross in US dollars	Notes
1	January 6, 2019	Aquaman	€1,159,591	$1,321,471	It was the weekend of Aquaman at the top-spot.
2	January 13, 2019	Aquaman	€1,004,391	$1,151,957	
3	January 20, 2019	Glass	€1,716,824	$2,066,736	
4	January 27, 2019	Creed II	€1,873,683	$2,137,444	
5	February 3, 2019	Under the Same Roof (Bajo el mismo techo)	€1,122,157	$1,283,500	Under the Same Roof was the first Spanish film to reach the number-one spot in 2019. It was also the worst number-one release of the year.
6	February 10, 2019	Green Book	€983,135	$1,105,599	Green Book took the first place on its second week.
7	February 17, 2019	Alita: Battle Angel	€1,729,453	$1,987,242	
8	February 24, 2019	How to Train Your Dragon: The Hidden World	€2,471,230	$2,644,332	
9	March 3, 2019	How to Train Your Dragon: The Hidden World	€1,587,586	$1,804,485	
10	March 10, 2019	Captain Marvel	€4,134,129	$4,894,726	
11	March 17, 2019	Captain Marvel	€2,032,700	$2,450,009	
12	March 24, 2019	Pain and Glory (Dolor y gloria)	€1,236,130	$1,407,446	Pain and Glory was the second Spanish film to reach the number-one spot in 2019.
13	March 31, 2019	Dumbo	€3,466,145	$3,721,948	
14	April 7, 2019	Dumbo	€2,814,754	$3,055,209	
15	April 14, 2019	I Can Quit Whenever I Want (Lo dejo cuando quiera)	€1,581,450	$1,786,949	I Can Quit Whenever I Want was the third Spanish film to reach the number-one spot in 2019.
16	April 21, 2019	I Can Quit Whenever I Want (Lo dejo cuando quiera)	€2,014,252	$2,194,708	
17	April 28, 2019	Avengers: Endgame	€10,337,265	$13,440,594	Avengers: Endgame had the best number-one and release of 2019.
18	May 5, 2019	Avengers: Endgame	€3,625,237	$4,119,574	
19	May 12, 2019	Detective Pikachu	€1,940,795	$2,180,179	
20	May 19, 2019	Detective Pikachu	€1,149,967	$1,283,159	
21	May 26, 2019	Aladdin	€4,751,359	$4,908,445	
22	June 2, 2019	Aladdin	€2,930,683	$3,031,402	
23	June 9, 2019	Aladdin	€2,487,676	$2,477,327	
24	June 16, 2019	Aladdin	€1,575,589	$1,588,947	
25	June 23, 2019	Toy Story 4	€3,097,234	$3,681,484	
26	June 30, 2019	Toy Story 4	€2,439,609	$2,638,967	
27	July 7, 2019	Spider-Man: Far From Home	€3,998,099	$4,361,687	
28	July 14, 2019	Spider-Man: Far From Home	€1,642,846	$1,847,603	
29	July 21, 2019	The Lion King †	€6,369,251	$8,561,381	
30	July 28, 2019	The Lion King †	€4,543,228	$5,342,605	
31	August 4, 2019	The Lion King †	€2,225,076	$2,491,685	
32	August 11, 2019	The Secret Life of Pets 2	€2,382,800	$2,549,805	
33	August 18, 2019	Once Upon a Time in Hollywood	€2,220,974	$2,412,140	
34	August 25, 2019	Once Upon a Time in Hollywood	€1,236,056	$1,370,250	
35	September 1, 2019	Once Upon a Time in Hollywood	€860,100	$939,670	The third weekend of Once Upon a Time in Hollywood had the lowest number-one of 2019.
36	September 8, 2019	It Chapter Two	€2,663,596	$2,937,682	
37	September 15, 2019	It Chapter Two	€1,449,629	$1,605,348	
38	September 22, 2019	Ad Astra	€1,908,705	$2,103,024	
39	September 29, 2019	While at War (Mientras dure la guerra)	€1,208,428	$1,331,454	While at War was the fourth Spanish film to reach the number-one spot in 2019.
40	October 6, 2019	Joker	€4,461,390	$4,897,782	
41	October 13, 2019	Joker	€4,484,575	$4,952,048	
42	October 20, 2019	Joker	€3,117,479	~$3,400,000	
43	October 27, 2019	Joker	€2,142,037	~$2,300,000	
44	November 3, 2019	Joker	€2,356,197	$2,630,859	
45	November 10, 2019	Joker	€1,186,522	$1,307,318	
46	November 17, 2019	If I Were Rich (Si yo fuera rico)	€2,110,242	$2,332,017	If I Were Rich was the fifth Spanish film to reach the number-one spot in 2019.
47	November 24, 2019	Frozen 2	€5,335,466	$5,895,852	
48	December 1, 2019	Frozen 2	€3,104,489	$3,448,018	
49	December 8, 2019	Frozen 2	€2,829,273	$2,962,120	
50	December 15, 2019	Jumanji: The Next Level	€2,439,504	$2,709,200	
51	December 22, 2019	Star Wars: The Rise of Skywalker	€5,442,764	$7,742,726	
52	December 29, 2019	Star Wars: The Rise of Skywalker	€2,880,477	$3,250,818	

== See also ==
- List of Spanish films — Spanish films by year
