= List of 2015 box office number-one films in Spain =

This is a list of films which placed number one at the weekend box office for the year 2015 in Spain.

== Number-one films ==
†	This implies the highest-grossing movie of the year.

#	Date	Film	Gross in euros	Gross in US dollars	Notes
1	January 4, 2015	The Hobbit: The Battle of the Five Armies	€1,444,303	$1,733,649	It was The Hobbit: The Battle of the Five Armies' third week at number one.
2	January 11, 2015	Fury	€1,337,779	$1,584,539	
3	January 18, 2015	Taken 3	€927,626	$1,073,728	
4	January 25, 2015	The Theory of Everything	€757,026	$848,560	The Theory of Everything reached the number-one spot in its second weekend of release.
5	February 1, 2015	Annie	€969,311	$1,094,611	
6	February 8, 2015	The SpongeBob Movie: Sponge Out of Water	€1,773,023	$2,007,408	
7	February 15, 2015	Fifty Shades of Grey	€7,241,383	$8,254,264	
8	February 22, 2015	Fifty Shades of Grey	€3,403,961	$3,874,434	
9	March 1, 2015	Fifty Shades of Grey	€1,765,659	$1,977,886	
10	March 8, 2015	Perdiendo el Norte	€1,298,466	$1,408,681	Perdiendo el Norte was the first Spanish film to reach number one in 2015.
11	March 15, 2015	Perdiendo el Norte	€1,449,295	$1,521,665	
12	March 22, 2015	Home	€1,850,606	$2,003,427	
13	March 29, 2015	Cinderella	€1,976,750	$2,153,463	
14	April 5, 2015	Furious 7	€4,239,465	$4,655,479	
15	April 12, 2015	Furious 7	€2,254,128	$2,390,785	
16	April 19, 2015	Furious 7	€1,105,822	$1,195,638	
17	April 26, 2015	The Water Diviner	€746,741	$812,258	The Water Diviner had the lowest number-one weekend debut of 2015.
18	May 3, 2015	Avengers: Age of Ultron	€4,344,592	$4,866,691	
19	May 10, 2015	Avengers: Age of Ultron	€1,587,456	$1,779,420	
20	May 17, 2015	Mad Max: Fury Road	€1,102,369	$1,237,435	
21	May 24, 2015	Pitch Perfect 2	€879,437	$968,949	
22	May 31, 2015	Tomorrowland	€1,218,154	$1,339,234	
23	June 7, 2015	Tomorrowland	€720,231	$800,764	The second weekend of Tomorrowland had the lowest number-one weekend of 2015.
24	June 14, 2015	Jurassic World	€6,573,281	$7,411,274	
25	June 21, 2015	Jurassic World	€2,972,273	$3,374,209	
26	June 28, 2015	Jurassic World	€2,024,643	$2,263,689	
27	July 5, 2015	Minions	€5,504,800	$6,122,022	
28	July 12, 2015	Minions	€2,969,978	$3,315,300	
29	July 19, 2015	Inside Out	€2,905,636	$3,147,284	
30	July 26, 2015	Inside Out	€1,915,008	$2,104,589	
31	August 2, 2015	Inside Out	€1,528,124	$1,678,944	
32	August 9, 2015	Mission: Impossible – Rogue Nation	€1,577,191	$1,730,059	
33	August 16, 2015	Inside Out	€895,133	$994,813	Inside Out reclaimed the number-one spot in its fifth weekend of release.
34	August 23, 2015	Fantastic Four	€1,021,401	$1,163,486	
35	August 30, 2015	Atrapa la bandera	€1,469,927	$1,644,545	Atrapa la Bandera was the second Spanish film to reach number one in 2015.
36	September 6, 2015	Atrapa la bandera	€1,433,443	$1,599,218	
37	September 13, 2015	The Visit	€1,571,119	$1,782,001	
38	September 20, 2015	Maze Runner: The Scorch Trials	€1,599,504	$1,808,371	
39	September 27, 2015	Everest	€1,075,308	$1,204,827	Everest reached the number-one spot in its second weekend of release.
40	October 4, 2015	Regression	€2,554,239	$2,849,632	Regression was the third Spanish film to reach number one in 2015.
41	October 11, 2015	Regression	€2,005,371	$2,278,106	
42	October 18, 2015	The Martian	€2,947,482	$3,346,711	
43	October 25, 2015	Hotel Transylvania 2	€2,896,231	$3,191,509	
44	November 1, 2015	Hotel Transylvania 2	€2,016,719	$2,220,640	
45	November 8, 2015	Spectre	€2,837,212	$3,047,521	
46	November 15, 2015	Spectre	€1,416,473	$1,526,454	
47	November 22, 2015	Ocho apellidos catalanes †	€8,080,337	$8,603,517	Ocho Apellidos Catalanes had the highest number-one weekend of 2015. It was the fourth Spanish film to reach number one in 2015.
48	November 29, 2015	Ocho apellidos catalanes †	€5,489,164	$5,816,887	
49	December 6, 2015	Ocho apellidos catalanes †	€3,860,214	$4,202,142	
50	December 13, 2015	Ocho apellidos catalanes †	€1,867,083	$2,053,206	
51	December 20, 2015	Star Wars: The Force Awakens	€7,992,785	$8,688,660	
52	December 27, 2015	Star Wars: The Force Awakens	€5,771,034	$6,328,027	

== Highest-grossing films ==
Highest-grossing films of 2015
Rank	Title	Distributor	Director(s)	Release	Country	Domestic Gross
1.	Ocho apellidos catalanes	Universal	Emilio Martínez-Lázaro	November 20	Spain	$40,308,423
2.	Fifty Shades of Grey	Universal	Sam Taylor-Johnson	February 13	United States	$38,323,430
3.	Star Wars: The Force Awakens	Disney	J. J. Abrams	December 18	United States	$37,471,520
4.	Minions	Universal	Pierre Coffin & Kyle Balda	July 3	United States	$26,725,673
5.	Jurassic World	Universal	Colin Trevorrow	June 12	United States	$24,901,213
6.	Inside Out	Disney	Pete Docter	July 17	United States	$24,035,511
7.	Palmeras en la nieve	Warner Bros.	Fernando González Molina	December 25	Spain; Colombia	$19,064,817
8.	Furious 7	Universal	James Wan	April 2	United States	$14,868,452
9.	Avengers: Age of Ultron	Disney	Joss Whedon	April 30	United States	$13,640,131
10.	The Hunger Games: Mockingjay – Part 2	eOne	Francis Lawrence	November 27	United States	$13,078,559

== See also ==
- List of Spanish films — Spanish films by year
