= List of 2018 box office number-one films in Spain =

This is a list of films which placed number one at the weekend box office for the year 2018 in Spain.

== Number-one films ==
†	This implies the highest-grossing movie of the year.

#	Date	Film	Gross in euros	Gross in US dollars	Notes
1	January 7, 2018	Insidious: The Last Key	€1,028,469	$1,237,181	
2	January 14, 2018	Jumanji: Welcome to the Jungle	€904,595	$1,080,759	Jumanji: Welcome to the Jungle reached the number-one spot in its fourth weekend of release
3	January 21, 2018	The Post	€1,327,663	$1,622,267	
4	January 28, 2018	Maze Runner: The Death Cure	€1,354,088	$1,683,142	
5	February 4, 2018	Sara's Notebook	€968,066	$1,205,862	Sara's Notebook was the first Spanish film to reach the number-one spot in 2018
6	February 11, 2018	Fifty Shades Freed	€4,125,219	$5,054,177	
7	February 18, 2018	Black Panther	€2,431,726	$3,017,030	
8	February 25, 2018	Black Panther	€1,344,053	$1,652,592	
9	March 4, 2018	Red Sparrow	€1,665,115	$2,051,140	
10	March 11, 2018	Red Sparrow	€1,125,272	$1,384,780	
11	March 18, 2018	Tomb Raider	€1,166,774	$1,433,912	
12	March 25, 2018	Peter Rabbit	€1,360,230	$1,680,333	
13	April 1, 2018	Ready Player One	€1,933,675	$2,383,134	
14	April 8, 2018	Campeones	€1,977,994	$2,429,371	
15	April 15, 2018	Campeones	€2,011,276	$2,479,995	
16	April 22, 2018	Campeones	€1,539,268	$1,891,457	
17	April 29, 2018	Avengers: Infinity War	€7,120,685	$8,637,415	
18	May 6, 2018	Avengers: Infinity War	€2,676,706	$3,201,801	
19	May 13, 2018	Avengers: Infinity War	€1,444,870	$1,725,424	
20	May 20, 2018	Deadpool 2	€3,548,405	$4,176,559	
21	May 27, 2018	Solo: A Star Wars Story	€2,165,144	$2,522,302	
22	June 3, 2018	Solo: A Star Wars Story	€1,338,871	$1,561,002	
23	June 10, 2018	Jurassic World: Fallen Kingdom	€7,026,312	$8,274,037	
24	June 17, 2018	Jurassic World: Fallen Kingdom	€2,912,806	$3,381,086	
25	June 24, 2018	Jurassic World: Fallen Kingdom	€1,426,059	$1,662,074	
26	July 1, 2018	Jurassic World: Fallen Kingdom	€1,111,848	$1,299,191	
27	July 8, 2018	Ant-Man and the Wasp	€1,975,017	$2,319,456	
28	July 15, 2018	Hotel Transylvania 3: Summer Vacation	€2,420,491	$2,828,337	
29	July 22, 2018	Mamma Mia: Here We Go Again!	€1,795,186	$2,104,309	
30	July 29, 2018	Mission: Impossible – Fallout	€1,508,984	$1,758,928	
31	August 5, 2018	Incredibles 2	€3,837,222	$4,438,661	
32	August 12, 2018	The Meg	€2,069,810	$2,362,257	
33	August 19, 2018	Incredibles 2	€1,378,168	$1,576,491	
34	August 26, 2018	Alpha	€1,074,432	$1,248,614	
35	September 2, 2018	Yucatan	€1,069,098	$1,240,253	
36	September 9, 2018	The Nun	€2,908,973	$3,360,643	
37	September 16, 2018	The Nun	€1,591,578	$1,849,812	
38	September 23, 2018	Johnny English Strikes Again	€1,012,574	$1,189,724	
39	September 30, 2018	Johnny English Strikes Again	€715,456	$830,284	
40	October 7, 2018	Venom	€3,135,306	$3,612,520	
41	October 14, 2018	Venom	€1,843,641	$2,131,130	
42	October 21, 2018	Venom	€853,804	$983,079	
43	October 28, 2018	Halloween	€1,173,035	$1,337,554	
44	November 4, 2018	Bohemian Rhapsody †	€4,562,862	$5,196,290	
45	November 11, 2018	Bohemian Rhapsody †	€2,877,258	$3,261,458	
46	November 18, 2018	Fantastic Beasts: The Crimes of Grindelwald	€4,040,847	$4,614,419	
47	November 25, 2018	Superlópez	€2,305,569	$2,614,024	
48	December 2, 2018	Superlópez	€1,808,057	$2,046,471	
49	December 9, 2018	Ralph Breaks the Internet	€2,580,597	$2,940,181	
50	December 16, 2018	Ralph Breaks the Internet	€1,406,971	$1,590,697	
51	December 23, 2018	Aquaman	€2,616,123	$2,974,895	
52	December 30, 2018	Aquaman	€2,044,603	$2,339,898	

== Highest-grossing films ==
Highest-grossing films of 2018 in Spain
Rank	Title	Distributor	Director(s)	Release	Country	Domestic Gross
1.	Bohemian Rhapsody	Fox	Bryan Singer	November 2	United Kingdom, United States	$31,151,119
2.	Jurassic World: Fallen Kingdom	Universal	J. A. Bayona	June 7	United States	$27,818,565
3.	Incredibles 2	Disney	Brad Bird	August 3	United States	$25,269,694
4.	Avengers: Infinity War	Disney	Anthony Russo, Joe Russo	April 27	United States	$24,809,385
5.	Campeones	Universal	Javier Fesser	April 6	Spain	$23,140,255
6.	Hotel Transylvania 3: Summer Vacation	Sony	Genndy Tartakovsky	July 13	United States	$15,650,419
7.	Aquaman	Warner Bros.	James Wan	December 21	United States	$15,559,288
8.	Fifty Shades Freed	Universal	James Foley	February 9	United States	$14,823,143
9.	Ralph Breaks the Internet	Disney	Rich Moore, Phil Johnston	December 5	United States	$14,444,037
10.	Superlópez	Disney	Javier Ruiz Caldera	November 23	Spain	$14,347,006

== See also ==
- List of Spanish films — Spanish films by year
