= List of 2009 box office number-one films in Spain =

This is a list of films which have placed number one at the weekend box office in Spain during 2009.

== Number-one films ==
†	This implies the highest-grossing movie of the year.

#	Date	Film	Gross in euros	Gross in US dollars	Notes
1	January 4, 2009	Australia	€1,738,537	$2,419,002	
2	January 11, 2009	Australia	€1,203,787	$1,621,480	
3	January 18, 2009	Seven Pounds	€3,349,360	$4,430,371	
4	January 25, 2009	Seven Pounds	€2,170,343	$2,817,895	
5	February 1, 2009	Valkyrie	€2,304,908	$2,951,982	
6	February 8, 2009	The Curious Case of Benjamin Button	€3,879,475	$5,018,076	
7	February 15, 2009	The Curious Case of Benjamin Button	€2,426,906	$3,120,218	
8	February 22, 2009	The Curious Case of Benjamin Button	€1,502,220	$1,926,170	
9	March 1, 2009	Slumdog Millionaire	€1,802,019	$2,256,473	Slumdog Millionaire reached No. 1 in its third weekend of release.
10	March 8, 2009	Gran Torino	€2,123,417	$2,683,115	
11	March 15, 2009	Gran Torino	€1,691,228	$2,185,896	
12	March 22, 2009	Gran Torino	€1,145,588	$1,555,238	
13	March 29, 2009	Mentiras y gordas	€1,723,002	$2,289,095	
14	April 5, 2009	Fast & Furious	€2,681,810	$3,614,786	
15	April 12, 2009	Monsters vs. Aliens	€2,539,170	$3,349,254	Monsters vs. Aliens reached No. 1 in its second weekend of release.
16	April 19, 2009	State of Play	€1,452,584	$1,894,049	
17	April 26, 2009	Fuga de cerebros	€1,219,443	$1,614,450	
18	May 3, 2009	X-Men Origins: Wolverine	€3,313,481	$4,395,412	
19	May 10, 2009	Hannah Montana: The Movie	€2,759,762	$3,761,072	
20	May 17, 2009	Angels & Demons	€5,158,309	$6,958,745	
21	May 24, 2009	Angels & Demons	€2,914,274	$4,078,018	
22	May 31, 2009	Angels & Demons	€1,596,902	$2,258,670	
23	June 7, 2009	Terminator Salvation	€3,299,460	$4,607,155	
24	June 14, 2009	Terminator Salvation	€1,068,254	$1,496,783	
25	June 21, 2009	Inkheart	€743,154	$1,035,322	Inkheart had the lowest number-one weekend debut of 2009.
26	June 28, 2009	Transformers: Revenge of the Fallen	€2,214,406	$3,111,694	
27	July 5, 2009	Ice Age: Dawn of the Dinosaurs	€5,412,134	$7,563,283	
28	July 12, 2009	Ice Age: Dawn of the Dinosaurs	€3,239,395	$4,513,075	
29	July 19, 2009	Harry Potter and the Half-Blood Prince	€3,974,784	$5,603,022	
30	July 26, 2009	The Taking of Pelham 123	€1,553,225	$2,205,127	
31	August 2, 2009	Up	€4,637,689	$6,609,690	
32	August 9, 2009	Up	€2,868,515	$4,066,970	
33	August 16, 2009	Public Enemies	€1,753,695	$2,489,912	
34	August 23, 2009	Public Enemies	€1,132,400	$1,621,699	
35	August 30, 2009	Up	€950,000	$1,358,300	Up reclaimed #1 in its fifth weekend of release.
36	September 6, 2009	He's Just Not That Into You	€1,399,535	$1,999,336	
37	September 13, 2009	District 9	€1,963,088	$2,859,435	
38	September 20, 2009	Inglourious Basterds	€2,797,539	$4,114,089	
39	September 27, 2009	Inglourious Basterds	€1,813,739	$2,663,347	
40	October 4, 2009	REC 2	€2,204,636	$3,212,444	
41	October 11, 2009	Agora †	€5,369,614	$7,907,189	
42	October 18, 2009	Agora †	€3,289,735	$4,902,443	
43	October 25, 2009	Agora †	€2,250,621	$3,376,826	
44	November 1, 2009	Agora †	€1,577,265	$2,320,224	
45	November 8, 2009	Celda 211	€1,385,491	$2,056,510	
46	November 15, 2009	2012	€5,670,614	$8,448,094	
47	November 22, 2009	The Twilight Saga: New Moon	€7,997,777	$11,883,416	The Twilight Saga: New Moon had the highest weekend debut of 2009.
48	November 29, 2009	The Twilight Saga: New Moon	€3,436,052	$5,152,274	
49	December 6, 2009	Spanish Movie	€2,186,628	$3,249,559	
50	December 13, 2009	Spanish Movie	€1,253,618	$1,833,043	
51	December 20, 2009	Avatar	€7,662,027	$10,989,711	
52	December 27, 2009	Avatar	€8,808,655	$12,667,033	The second weekend of Avatar had the highest weekend gross of 2009.

== See also ==
- List of Spanish films — Spanish films by year
