= List of Spanish films =

A list of the most notable films produced in the Cinema of Spain, ordered by decade and year of release on separate pages. For an alphabetical list of articles on Spanish films, see Category:Spanish films.

== Before 1950 ==
- List of Spanish films before 1930
- List of Spanish films of the 1930s
- List of Spanish films of the 1940s

== 1950–1999 ==
- 1950
- 1951
- 1952
- 1953
- 1954
- 1955
- 1956
- 1957
- 1958
- 1959
- 1960
- 1961
- 1962
- 1963
- 1964
- 1965
- 1966
- 1967
- 1968
- 1969
- 1970
- 1971
- 1972
- 1973
- 1974
- 1975
- 1976
- 1977
- 1978
- 1979
- 1980
- 1981
- 1982
- 1983
- 1984
- 1985
- 1986
- 1987
- 1988
- 1989
- 1990
- 1991
- 1992
- 1993
- 1994
- 1995
- 1996
- 1997
- 1998
- 1999

== 21st century ==
- 2000
- 2001
- 2002
- 2003
- 2004
- 2005
- 2006
- 2007
- 2008
- 2009
- 2010
- 2011
- 2012
- 2013
- 2014
- 2015
- 2016
- 2017
- 2018
- 2019
- 2020
- 2021
- 2022
- 2023
- 2024
- 2025
- 2026

== See also ==
- List of years in Spain
- List of years in Spanish television
