= Edwin S. Porter filmography =

The following is a list of films by Edwin S. Porter, head producer at the Edison Manufacturing Company owned by Thomas A. Edison, between 1900 and 1909. Later films were produced at the Rex Motion Picture Company and Famous Players Film Company.

== 1900 ==
- An Animated Luncheon
- An Artist's Dream
- Ching Ling Foo Outdone
- The Clown and the Alchemist
- Congress of Nations
- A Dull Razor
- Faust and Margeurite
- The Magician
- The Mystic Swing
- Uncle Josh in a Spooky Hotel
- Uncle Josh's Nightmare
- Why Mrs. Jones Got a Divorce
- A Wringing Good Joke

== 1901 ==
- Another Job for the Undertaker
- Aunt Sallie's Wonderful Bustle
- The Automatic Weather Prophet
- Building Made Easy, or How Mechanics Work in the Twentieth Century
- Catching an Early Train
- Circular Panorama of Electric Tower
- Day at the Circus
- The Donkey Party
- Esquimaux Game of Snap-the-Whip
- Esquimaux Leap-Frog
- The Esquimaux Village
- Execution of Czolgosz with Panorama of Auburn Prison
- The Farmer and the Bad Boys
- Faust Family of Acrobats
- The Finish of Bridget McKeen
- The Finish of Michael Casey, or Blasting Rocks in Harlem
- Follow the Leader
- Fun in a Butcher Shop
- Gordon Sisters Boxing
- Happy Hooligan April-Fooled
- Happy Hooligan Surprised
- How the Dutch Beat the Irish
- The Jeffreys and Ruhlin Sparring Contest at San Francisco
- A Joke on Grandma
- Kansas Saloon Smashers
- Laura Comstock's Bag-Punching Dog
- Life Rescue at Atlantic City
- Life Rescue at Long Branch
- Little Willie's Last Celebration
- Love by the Light of the Moon
- Love in a Hammock
- The Lovers, Coal Box and Fireplace
- Lukens, Novel Gymnast
- The Martyred Presidents
- The Musical Ride
- The Mysterious Cafe
- The Old Maid Having Her Picture Taken
- The Old Maid in the Drawing Room (also known as The Old Maid in the Horsecar)
- Pan-American Exposition By Night
- Panorama of the Esplanade By Night
- Panoramic View of Electric Tower from a Balloon
- A Phenomenal Contortionist
- The Photographer's Mishap
- Photographing a Country Couple
- Pie, Tramp and the Bulldog
- President McKinley and Escort Going to the Capitol
- President McKinley's Funeral Cortege at Washington, DC
- The Reversible Divers
- Rubes in the Theatre
- Sampson-Schley Controversy
- Soubrette's Troubles on a Fifth Avenue Stage Coach
- Stage Coach Hold-Up in the Days of '49
- Terrible Teddy, the Grizzly King
- The Tramp and the Nursing Bottle
- The Tramp's Dream
- The Tramp's Miraculous Escape
- The Tramp's Strategy That Failed
- The Tramp's Unexpected Skate
- Trapeze Disrobing Act
- A Trip Around the Pan-American Exhibition
- A Trip Through the Columbia Exposition
- 'Weary Willie' and the Gardener
- What Demoralized the Barber Shop
- What Happened on Twenty-third Street, New York City
- Why Brigit Stopped Drinking
- Why Mr. Nation Wants a Divorce

== 1902 ==
- Appointment by Telephone
- Babies Rolling Eggs
- The Bull and the Picnickers
- The Burlesque Suicide, No. 2
- Burning of Durland's Riding Academy
- Burning of St. Pierre [Martinique]
- Capture of the Biddle Brothers
- Charleston Chain-Gang
- Chinese Shaving Scene
- Facial Expression
- Female Facial Expressions
- Fun in a Bakery Shop
- The Golden Chariots
- Great Bull Fight
- Happy Hooligan Turns Burglar
- Hooligan's Fourth of July
- How They Do Things on the Bowery
- The Interrupted Bathers
- The Interrupted Picnic
- Jack and the Beanstalk
- Mt. Pelee in Eruption and Destruction of St. Pierre
- Mt. Pelee Smoking Before Eruption
- New York City in a Blizzard
- Oh! Shut Up
- Prince Henry at Lincoln Monument, Chicago, Ill. German and American Tableau
- Rock of Ages
- Smashing a Jersey Mosquito
- Smith's Wife Inspects the New Typewriter
- The Twentieth Century Tramp; or, Happy Hooligan and His Airship
- Uncle Josh at the Moving Picture Show
- The Weary Hunters and the Magician

== 1903 ==
- 69th Regiment N.G.N.Y.
- "Africander" Winning the Suburban Handicap
- The Animated Poster
- Arabian Jewish Dance
- Baby Class at Lunch
- The Baby Review
- Buster's Joke on Papa
- Casey and His Neighbor's Goat
- Down Where the Wurzburger Flows
- An East River Novelty
- East Side Urchins Bathing in a Fountain
- Electrocuting an Elephant
- The Extra Turn
- Fireboat "New Yorker" In Action
- The Gay Shoe Clerk
- Goo Goo Eyes
- The Great Train Robbery
- Happy Hooligan in a Trap
- Happy Hooligan's Interrupted Lunch
- The Heavenly Twins at Lunch
- The Heavenly Twins at Odds
- How Old Is Ann?
- Lehigh Valley Black Diamond Express
- Life of an American Fireman
- Little Lillian, Toe Danseuse
- The Messenger Boy's Mistake
- Miss Jessie Cameron, Champion Child Sword Dancer
- Miss Jessie Dougherty, Champion Female Highland Fling Dancer
- New York Caledonian Club's Parade
- New York City Dumping Wharf
- New York City Police Parade
- New York City Public Bath
- New York Harbor Police Boat Patrol Capturing Pirates
- The Office Boy's Revenge
- Old-Fashioned Scottish Reel
- Orphans in the Surf
- Panorama of Blackwell's Island
- Panorama of Riker's Island, N.Y.
- Panorama Water Front and Brooklyn Bridge from East River
- The Physical Culture Girl
- Razzle Dazzle
- A Romance of the Rail
- Rube and Fender
- Rube and Mandy at Coney Island
- Scenes in an Orphans' Asylum
- Seashore Frolics
- Sorting Refuse at Incinerating Plant, New York City
- Steam Scow "Cinderella" and Ferryboat "Cincinnati"
- The Still Alarm
- Street Car Chivalry
- Subub Surprises the Burglar
- Throwing the Sixteen Pound Hammer
- Turning the Tables
- Two Chappies in a Box
- The Unappreciated Joke
- Uncle Tom's Cabin
- Under the Mistletoe
- What Happened in the Tunnel
- White Wings on Review

== 1904 ==
- Animated Painting
- Annual Parade, New York Fire Department
- Babe and Puppies
- Bad Boy's Joke on the Nurse
- Battle of Chemulpo Bay
- Buster and Tige Put a Balloon Vendor Out of Business
- Buster Brown and His Dog Tige
- Buster Brown and the Dude
- Buster Makes Room for His Mama at the Bargain Counter
- Buster's Dog to the Rescue
- Buster's Revenge on the Tramp
- Canoeing on the Charles River, Boston, Mass.
- Capture of the 'Yegg' Bank Burglars
- Casey's Frightful Dream
- Circular Panorama of the Horse Shoe Falls in Winter
- City Hall to Harlem in 15 Seconds, via the Subway Route
- Cohen's Advertising Scheme
- The Cop Fools the Sergeant
- Crossing Ice Bridge at Niagara Falls
- Dog Factory
- Elephants Shooting the Chutes at Luna Park
- The European Rest Cure
- The Ex-Convict
- Fire and Flames at Luna Park, Coney Island
- From Rector's Bank to Claremont
- Halloween Night at the Seminary
- Hold-Up in a Country Grocery Store
- How a French Nobleman Got a Wife Through the New York Herald Personal Columns
- Ice Boating on the North Shrewsbury, Red Bank, N.J.
- Ice Skating in Central Park, N.Y.
- Inter-Collegiate Athletic Association Championships, 1904
- Inter-Collegiate Regatta, Poughkeepsie, N.Y., 1904
- Japanese Acrobats
- Little German Band
- Love Will Find a Way
- Maniac Chase
- Midnight Intruder
- Miss Lillian Shaffer and Her Dancing Horse
- Old Maid and Fortune Teller
- Opening Ceremonies, New York Subway, October 27, 1904
- Parsifal
- Photographing a Female Crook
- Pranks of Buster Brown and His Dog Tige
- R.F. Outcault Making a Sketch of Buster and Tige
- Railroad Smash-Up
- Rector's to Claremont
- Rounding Up of the "Yeggmen"
- A Rube Couple at the County Fair
- Scarecrow Pump
- Scenes in an Infant Orphan Asylum
- Skirmish Between Russian and Japanese Advance Guards
- Sleighing in Central Park, New York
- Sliding Down Ice Mound at Niagara Falls
- The Strenuous Life; or, Anti-Race Suicide
- Treloar and Miss Marshall, Prize Winners at the Physical Culture Show in Madison Square Garden
- "Weary Willie" Kidnaps a Child
- "Weary Willie" Kisses the Bride (also known as Nervy Nat Kisses the Bride)
- Western Stage Coach Hold Up
- White Star S.S. Baltic Leaving Pier on First Eastern Voyage
- Wifey's Mistake

== 1905 ==
- Bicycle Police Chasing Scorching Auto
- Boarding School Girls
- The Burglar's Slide for Life
- Coney Island at Night
- Desperate Encounter Between Burglar and Police
- Down on the Farm
- The Electric Mule
- Empire State Express, the Second, Taking Water on the Fly
- Everybody Works But Father
- A Five Cent Trolley Ride
- Hanging Stockings on a Christmas Tree
- Hippodrome Races, Dreamland, Coney Island
- How Jones Lost His Roll
- Inauguration of President Roosevelt. President-Elect Roosevelt, Vice-President-Elect Fairbanks and Escort Going to the Capitol
- Inauguration of President Roosevelt. Taking the Oath of Office
- Inauguration of President Roosevelt. The Grand Inaugural Parade
- June's Birthday Party
- The Kleptomaniac
- Life of an American Policeman
- The Little Train Robbery
- The Miller's Daughter
- Mystic Shriner's Day, Dreamland, Coney Island
- The Night Before Christmas
- Opening of Belmont Park Race Course
- Phoebe Snow
- Police Chasing Scorching Auto
- Poor Algy
- President Roosevelt's Inauguration
- Raffles, the Dog
- A River Tragedy
- Scenes and Incidents, Russo-Japanese Peace Conference, Portsmouth, N. H.
- The Seven Ages
- Start of Ocean Race for Kaiser's Cup
- Stolen by Gypsies
- The Train Wreckers
- The Watermelon Patch
- The White Caps
- The Whole Dam Family and the Dam Dog

== 1906 ==
- Dream of a Rarebit Fiend
- Getting Evidence, Showing the Trials and Tribulations of a Private Detective
- The Honeymoon at Niagara Falls
- How the Office Boy Saw the Ball Game
- Kathleen Mavourneen
- Life of a Cowboy
- Minstrel Mishaps; or, Late for Rehearsal
- Phoebe Snow
- A Tale of the Sea
- The Terrible Kids
- Three American Beauties
- Waiting at the Church
- A Winter Straw Ride

== 1907 ==
- Cohen's Fire Sale
- College Chums
- Daniel Boone
- Jack the Kisser
- Laughing Gas
- A Little Girl Who Did Not Believe in Santa Claus
- Lost in the Alps
- Midnight Ride of Paul Revere
- The Nine Lives of a Cat
- A Race for Millions
- The Rivals
- Stage Struck
- A Suburbanite's Ingenious Alarm
- The "Teddy" Bears
- Three American Beauties, No. 2
- The Trainer's Daughter; or, A Race for Love
- Vesta Victoria Singing "Poor John"
- Vesta Victoria Singing "Waiting at the Church"

== 1908 ==
- The Angel Child
- Animated Snowballs
- The Army of Two (An Incident During the American Revolution)
- The Blue and the Gray; or, The Days of '61
- The Boston Tea Party
- Bridal Couple Dodging Cameras
- Buying a Title
- Cocoa Industry, Trinidad, British West Indies
- Colonial Virginia, Historical Scenes and Incidents Connected with the Founding of Jamestown, VA
- A Comedy in Black and White
- A Country Girl's Seminary Life and Experiences
- The Cowboy and the Schoolmarm
- Cupid's Pranks
- Curious Mr. Curio
- The Devil
- Ex-Convict No. 900
- The Face on the Barroom Floor
- Fireside Reminiscences
- Fly Paper
- The Gentleman Burglar
- Heard Over the 'Phone
- Honesty Is the Best Policy
- The King's Pardon
- The Little Coxswain of the Varsity 8
- Lord Feathertop
- Love Will Find a Way
- The Lovers' Telegraph Code
- The Merry Widow Waltz Craze
- Miss Sherlock Holmes
- Nellie, the Pretty Typewriter: A Romance Among the Skyscrapers
- Nero and the Burning of Rome
- The New Stenographer
- The Old Maids' Temperance Club
- The Painter's Revenge
- A Persistent Suitor
- Pioneers Crossing the Plains in '49
- Playmates
- Pocahontas: A Child of the Forest
- Rescued from an Eagle's Nest
- Romance of a War Nurse
- Sandy McPherson's Quiet Fishing Trip
- Saved by Love
- A Sculptor's Welsh Rarebit Dream
- Skinner's Finish
- Stage Memories of an Old Theatrical Trunk
- Tale the Autumn Leaves Told
- Tales the Searchlight Told
- Ten Pickaninnies
- An Unexpected Santa Claus
- A Voice from the Dead
- When Reuben Comes to Town
- Wifey's Strategy
- A Yankee Man-o-Warsman's Fight for Love: An Incident During the Pacific Cruise of the American Fleet

== 1909 ==
- The Adventures of an Old Flirt
- A Bird in a Gilded Cage
- A Burglar Cupid
- Capital Versus Labor
- A Child of the Forest
- A Child's Prayer
- The Colored Stenographer
- A Coward
- A Cry from the Wilderness; or, A Tale of the Esquimaux and Midnight Sun
- A Cup of Tea and She
- A Daughter of the Sun
- The Doctored Dinner Pail
- Father's First Half-Holiday
- Faust
- Fuss and Feathers
- A Gift from Santa Claus
- A Great Game
- Hansel and Gretel
- Hard to Beat
- The Heart of a Clown
- The House of Cards
- The Iconoclast
- Love Is Blind
- Love's Sacrifice
- Mary Jane's Lovers
- A Midnight Supper
- A Modest Young Man
- Oh! Rats!
- On the Western Frontier
- A Persistent Suitor
- The Pony Express
- The Price of a Soul
- A Road to Love, or Romance of a Yankee Engineer in Central America
- See a Pin and Pick It Up, All That Day You'll Have Good Luck
- The Strike
- The Temptation
- The Three Kisses
- Toys of Fate
- Uncle Tom Wins
- Unappreciated Genius
- An Unsuccessful Substitution
- Where Is My Wandering Boy Tonight?

== 1910 ==
- Alice's Adventures in Wonderland
- All on Account of a Laundry Mark
- Almost a Hero
- The Attack on the Mill
- Bear Hunt in the Rockies
- Bradford's Claim
- A Bridegroom's Mishaps
- The Cattle Thief's Revenge
- A Clause in the Will
- Cohen's Generosity
- A Cowboy's Courtship
- The Cowpuncher's Glove
- The Education of Mary Jane
- The Engineer's Romance
- The Farmer's Daughter
- For Her Sister's Sake
- Forgiven
- Fruit Growing, Grand Valley, Colorado (The Results of Irrigation)
- A Game for Life
- The Girl Strike Leader
- Great Marshall Jewel Case
- The Greater Love
- Hazing a New Scholar
- The Heart of a Rose
- Her First Appearance
- His Mother's Thanksgiving
- Indian Squaw's Sacrifice
- The Last Straw
- The Livingston Case
- Love and the Law
- Luck of Roaring Camp
- Married in Haste
- The Old Loves and the New
- Ononko's Vow
- Out of the Night
- Pardners
- Peg Woffington
- Ranson's Folly
- Repaid with Interest
- Retribution
- Riders of the Plains
- Russia, the Land of Oppression
- Saved From Himself
- A Schoolmarm's Ride for Life
- Shanghaied
- The Stolen Claim
- The Tale the Camera Told
- That Letter from Teddy
- Too Many Girls
- The Toymaker, the Doll and the Devil
- Wanted: An Athletic Instructor
- A Western Romance
- Wild Bill's Defeat
- The Winning of Miss Langdon

== 1911 ==
- The Artist Financier
- As Ye Sow
- A Breach of Faith
- A Buried Past
- By the Light of the Moon
- Called Back
- Captain Nell
- Castles in the Air
- Chasing a Rainbow
- The Colonel's Daughter
- A Cure for Crime
- A Daughter of the Revolution
- The Derelict
- An Exception to the Rule
- Faith
- The Fall of a Knight
- A Famous Duel
- Fate
- Five Hours
- From Death to Life
- The Guardsman
- The Heiress
- Her Sister
- Her Way
- Heroine of '76
- The Iron Master
- Leaves of a Romance
- The Lighthouse by the Sea
- The Little Major
- Lost Illusions
- The Lover and the Count
- Madeline's Rebellion
- The Martyr
- The Measure of a Man
- Money to Burn
- The Monogram "J.O."
- A Night of Terror
- On the Brink
- The Price of Victory
- The Realization
- The Return
- The Rose and the Dagger
- Saints and Sinners
- Securing Evidence
- Sherlock Holmes, Jr.
- Silver Threads Among the Gold
- The Story of a Prayer Rug
- The Strangers
- The Strike at the Mines
- The Tale of a Cat
- The Test of Love
- The Torn Scarf
- The Twins
- The Ultimate Sacrifice
- An Unwelcome Saint
- The Vagabond
- Where the Shamrock Grows
- The White Red Man

== 1912 ==
- Angels Unawares
- The Attack on the Mill
- Beauty and the Beast
- A Boarding House Mystery
- Bob's Deception
- The Convict's Parole
- Drawing the Line
- The Eternal Conflict
- Eyes That See Not
- Faraway Fields
- The Final Pardon
- Fine Feathers
- The Flirt
- From the Wild
- Grandfather's Clock
- The Greater Christian
- The Greater Love
- The Hand of Mystery
- The Hidden Light
- If Dreams Come True
- A Japanese Idyll
- A Kentucky Feud
- The Lash of Fate
- Leaves in a Storm
- Love's Four Stone Walls
- Modern Slaves
- An Old-Fashioned Girl
- The Old Organist
- The Parting of the Ways
- The Power of Thought
- The Price of Money
- The Price of Peace
- A Prophet Without Honor
- A Sane Asylum
- The Squatter's Rights
- State's Warning
- Taming Mrs. Shrew
- A Tangled Web
- Through a Higher Power
- Under Her Wing
- The Wedding March
- The Weight of a Feather

== 1913 ==
- The Count of Monte Cristo
- His Neighbor's Wife
- In the Bishop's Carriage
- The Prisoner of Zenda

== 1914 ==
- The Crucible
- A Good Little Devil
- Hearts Adrift
- The Spitfire
- Such a Little Queen
- Tess of the Storm Country

== 1915 ==
- Bella Donna
- The Dictator
- The Eternal City
- Jim the Penman
- Lydia Gilmore
- The Morals of Marcus
- Niobe
- The Prince and the Pauper
- Sold
- When We Were Twenty-One
- The White Pearl
- Zaza
