= Another Job for the Undertaker =

- Directed by: Edwin S. Porter and George S. Fleming
- Produced by: Edison Studios
- Cinematography: Edwin S. Porter
- Release date: May 15, 1901
- Running time: 2 minutes
- Country: United States
- Languages: Silent film English

Another Job for the Undertaker is a 1901 silent comic trick film made at Edison's recently opened studio at 41 East 21st Street in Manhattan. It was photographed by Edwin S. Porter and co-directed by Porter and George S. Fleming. The two-shot film was copyrighted on May 15, 1901 and is approximately two minutes in length. It lacks a head title, which would have been supplied by projecting a separate lantern slide before screening the film.

== Plot ==
An Edison catalog describes the film:

Shows a bedroom in a hotel. On the wall of the room is a conspicuous sign "Don't blow out the gas." A hayseed enters the room, accompanied by a bellboy. The boy deposits the Rube's bag and umbrella, turns a somersault, and vanishes through the door. The Rube then removes his hat and coat and places them upon the table. They immediately vanish. He then blows out the gas. The scene then instantly changes to a funeral procession, headed by Reuben's hearse, and followed by the carriages of his country friends. Strictly up-to-date picture.

== In popular culture ==
Reuben or Rube (like Uncle Josh) was a stereotypical country bumpkin: a comic character who flourished in American popular culture in the later nineteenth and early twentieth centuries. He is perplexed by modernity. In this case, he treats a gas lamp like a candle, blowing out the flame which leads to his asphyxiation and death. Other Edison films from this period feature Rube, including Rubes in the Theatre (1901) and Rube and Mandy at Coney Island (1903).

== See also ==
- Edwin S. Porter filmography
