= List of comedy films before 1920 =

A list of the earliest comedy films produced before the 1920.

== Pre-1910 ==
Title	Director	Cast	Country	Notes
1894
Fred Ott's Sneeze	William Kennedy Dickson	Fred Ott	United States	
1895
Robetta and Doretto	William K. L. Dickson		France	
Watering the Gardener	Louis Lumiere		France	
1896
Patineur Grotesque	Marius Sestier		Australia	
Interrupted Lover				
1897
In a Chinese Laundry				
The Milker's Mishap	James H. White		United States	
George Albert Smith	George Albert Smith		United Kingdom	
New Pillow Fight		Emily Lubin and Marguerite Sessler	United States	
Young America				
1898
The Inquisitive Girls				
The Minister's Wooing				
The Nearsighted School Teacher		Augusta Selmer	United States	
The Old Maid and the Burglar				
Little Willy and the Minister				
1899
Armor vs. Armour				
An Exciting Finish				
1900
Above the Limit	Frederick S. Armitage	Charley Grapewin	United States	
The Burglar-Proof Bed				
I Had to Leave a Happy Home For You				
1901
A Joke on Grandma				
1903
I Want My Dinner				
A Narrow Escape				
The Magical Tramp				
1905
Everybody Works But Father				
The Little Train Robbery	Edwin S. Porter		United States	
Raffles the Dog				
1906
Humorous Phases of Funny Faces	J. Stuart Blackton	J. Stuart Blackton	United States	
Dr. Dippy's Sanitarium				
1907
College Chums				
1908
A Calamitcus Elapment				
The Painter's Revenge				
The Taming of the Shrew				
1909
Cohen at Corey Island				
The New Cop				
Tag Day				

== 1910s ==
Title	Director	Cast	Country	Notes
1910
Making a Man of Him				
Davy Jones and Captain Bragg				
1911
Money to Burn				
1912
Making a Man of Her				
A Near-Tragedy				
The New Neighbor				
O'Brien's Busy Day				
1913
The New Pupil				
Nursey Favorites				
1914
A Busy Day	J. Stuart Blackton	Charlie Chaplin and J. Stuart Blackton	United States	
Between Showers	Henry Lehrman	Charlie Chaplin, Ford Sterling, Emma Clifton, and Chester Conklin	United States	
Kid Auto Races at Venice	Henry Lehrman	Charlie Chaplin	United States	
Making a Living	Henry Lehrman	Charlie Chaplin	United States	
The New Janitor	Charlie Chaplin	Charlie Chaplin	United States	
Twenty Minutes of Love	Charlie Chaplin	Charlie Chaplin	United States	
1915
Fatty's Tintype Tangle	Roscoe "Fatty" Arbuckle	Roscoe Arbuckle, Louise Fazenda, Edgar Kennedy, Minta Durfee and Frank Hayes.	United States	
Ragtime Snap Shots	Hal Roach	Harold Lloyd	United States	
The Tramp	Charlie Chaplin	Charlie Chaplin, Edna Purviance, and Ernest Van Pelt	United States	
A Woman	Charlie Chaplin	Charlie Chaplin	United States	
1916
Behind the Screen	Charlie Chaplin	Charlie Chaplin, Eric Campbell, and Edna Purviance	United States	
The Fireman	Charlie Chaplin	Charlie Chaplin, Edna Purviance, and Lloyd Bacon	United States	
The Floorwalker	Charlie Chaplin	Charlie Chaplin, Eric Campbell, and Lloyd Bacon	United States	
The Pawnshop	Charlie Chaplin	Charlie Chaplin, Henry Bergman, Edna Purviance, Albert Austin, and Eric Campbell	United States	
The Vagabond	Charlie Chaplin	Charlie Chaplin, Edna Purviance, Eric Campbell, Leo White, and Lloyd Bacon	United States	
1917
The Adventurer	Charlie Chaplin	Charlie Chaplin, Edna Purviance, and Eric Campbell	United States	
Back Stage	Arvid E. Gillstrom	Oliver Hardy	United States	
Easy Street	Charlie Chaplin	Charlie Chaplin, Edna Purviance, and Eric Campbell	United States	
The Immigrant	Charlie Chaplin	Charlie Chaplin, Edna Purviance, and Eric Campbell	United States	
The Poor Little Rich Girl	Maurice Tourneur	Mary Pickford, Madlaine Traverse, Charles Wellesley, Gladys Fairbanks and Frank McGlynn Sr.	United States	Comedy drama
Rebecca of Sunnybrook Farm	Marshall Neilan	Mary Pickford and Eugene O'Brien	United States	Comedy drama
1918
The Cook	Roscoe "Fatty" Arbuckle	Roscoe Arbuckle, Buster Keaton, and Al St. John	United States	
Good-Night, Nurse!	Roscoe Arbuckle	Roscoe "Fatty" Arbuckle and Buster Keaton	United States	
O, It's Great to Be Crazy				
1919
Back Stage	Roscoe Arbuckle	Roscoe "Fatty" Arbuckle, Buster Keaton and Al St. John	United States	
The Hayseed	Roscoe "Fatty" Arbuckle	Roscoe Arbuckle and featuring Buster Keaton	United States	
Hoot, Moon!				
Short Hustling For Health				
