= The Martyred Presidents =

- Directed by: Edwin S. Porter
- Starring: See below
- Cinematography: Edwin S. Porter
- Release date: October 19, 1901
- Running time: 1 minute
- Country: United States
- Language: English

The Martyred Presidents is a 1901 American film directed by Edwin S. Porter.

== Plot summary ==
The film, just over a minute long, is composed of two shots. In the first, a girl sits at the base of an altar or tomb, her face hidden from the camera. At the center of the altar, a viewing portal displays the portraits of three U.S. Presidents—Abraham Lincoln, James A. Garfield, and William McKinley—each a victim of assassination.

In the second shot, which runs just over eight seconds long, an assassin kneels at the feet of Lady Justice.

== Production ==
Evocative of early magic lantern and Phantasmagoria shows, The Martyred Presidents is part of a cycle of films made by the Edison Studios to chronicle the McKinley assassination in Buffalo, New York at the 1901 Pan-American Exposition. An Edison catalog from the time suggests to exhibitors that The Martyred Presidents be used as a closing tableau when "...shown in connection with the funeral ceremonies of the illustrious McKinley."

== See also ==
- Edwin S. Porter filmography
