= The Magician (1900 film) =

- Directed by: Edwin S. Porter
- Produced by: Edison Manufacturing Company
- Distributed by: Edison Manufacturing Company
- Release date: 28 February 1900
- Running time: 1 minute
- Country: United States
- Language: silent

The Magician is a 1900 American silent trick film produced by Thomas A. Edison's Edison Manufacturing Company. According to the Edison film catalog, the film originally was sold to theaters for $9.00. This film exemplifies the strong links between early film and magic; the 1900 Edison film catalog alone contained several trick films, including Ching Ling Foo Outdone, The Clown and the Alchemist, Congress of Nations and Hooligan Assists the Magician.

== Plot ==
The Magician (1900)

The film takes place in an interior space, possibly a parlor. The magician enters from screen right, walks to the center of the frame and bows. He takes off his glove and throws it into the air (where it disappears) and does the same trick with his hat and coat. He pulls out a white handkerchief and holds it in front of his legs. When he removes the handkerchief, his pants have changed to knickers. In his final trick, the magician gestures and a table piled with streamers appears. The magician picks up the pile, shakes it, and three geese fly out toward the camera.
