= Skinner's Finish =

Skinner's Finish (Skinny's Finish)
- Directed by: Edwin S. Porter
- Produced by: Edison Manufacturing Company; Thomas Edison
- Distributed by: Edison Manufacturing Company
- Release date: June 3, 1908
- Running time: short
- Country: USA
- Language: Silent..English titles

Skinner's Finish (also known as Skinny's Finish) is a 1908 silent film comedy short directed by Edwin S. Porter and produced by the Edison Manufacturing Company.

The film is preserved in the Library of Congress collection.

== Cast ==
- Charles Inslee
- William V. Ranous

== See also ==
- Edwin S. Porter filmography
