= Laura Comstock's Bag-Punching Dog =

1901 film by Edwin S. Porter

- Directed by: Edwin S. Porter
- Distributed by: Edison Manufacturing Company
- Release date: May 6, 1901
- Running time: 1:30
- Country: United States
- Language: Silent/English

Laura Comstock's Bag-Punching Dog is a 1901 silent short film directed by Edwin S. Porter. The film depicts a vaudeville act featuring Laura Comstock and her trained dog, a pit bull named Mannie. Comstock's act was currently appearing at Keith's Union Square Theatre.

The film begins with a five-second shot of Comstock and her dog seated at a table and looking at the camera, with a sign in the foreground that says "Laura Comstock". Following this, the rest of the film shows Mannie in front of a rustic backdrop, repeatedly jumping and punching a bag suspended by a rope.

Edison's film catalog said that Mannie's "high jumps and lightning-like punches are remarkable and cause one to marvel at the amount of patience that must be necessary to teach a dog such tricks."

The technique of opening a film with a portrait-style shot of the performers was new to film. This was an innovation by Porter based on the practice of showing lantern-slide photos preceding the exhibition of filmed scenes. It proved influential, and was adopted by other American producers during this period.

Mannie appeared in a number of subsequent Edison films, including several Buster Brown shorts, the Happy Hooligan short Pie, Tramp and the Bulldog, and The Whole Dam Family and the Dam Dog.

== See also ==
- Edwin S. Porter filmography
