= College Chums =

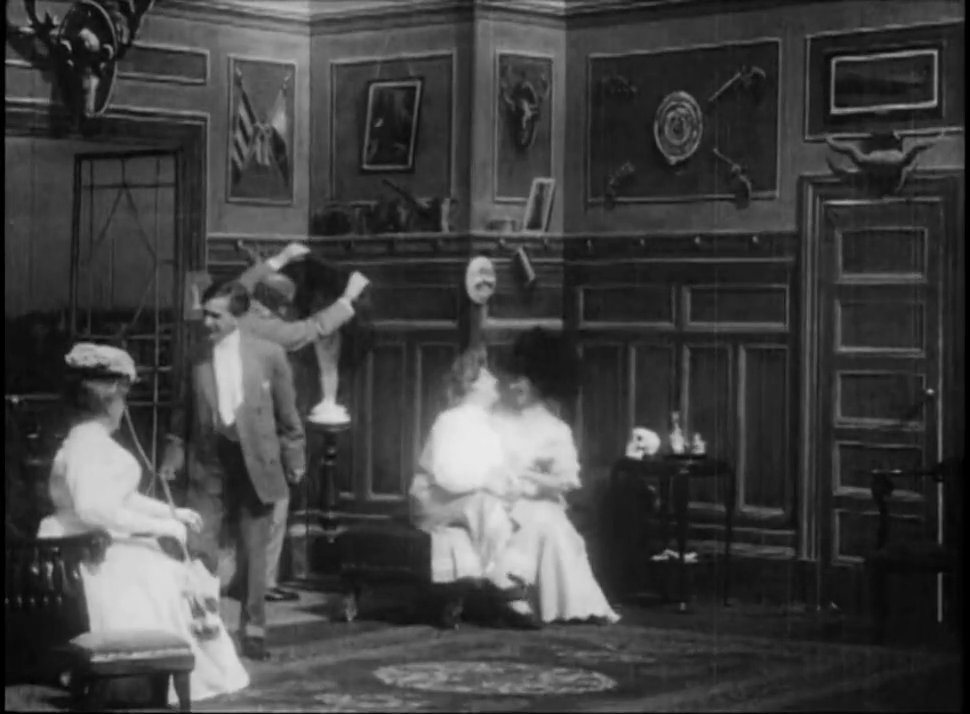
- College Chums, shot 5
- Directed by: Edwin S. Porter
- Starring: Edward Boulden; Miss Acton; Miss Antoinette
- Production company: Edison Manufacturing Company
- Release date: December 7, 1907
- Running time: 11 minutes
- Country: United States
- Language: Silent film

College Chums is an American silent film directed by Edwin S. Porter, and produced by the Edison Manufacturing Company.

== Plot summary ==
College Chums (1907)

In a park, a young woman sees her fiancé being affectionate with another woman. When she phones him to demand an explanation, he tells her that it was his sister. She is not satisfied, and insists on coming over to meet his 'sister'. As the young man broods over how to get out of trouble, a male college friend comes over and offers to pretend to be the sister. At first this works, but soon it creates complications as first his fiancée and then her father start flirting with the friend.

== Cast ==
- Miss Acton
- Miss Antoinette
- Edward Boulden
- Katherine Griffith
- Mr. Kennedy
- Mr. Kurtis

== Production and release ==
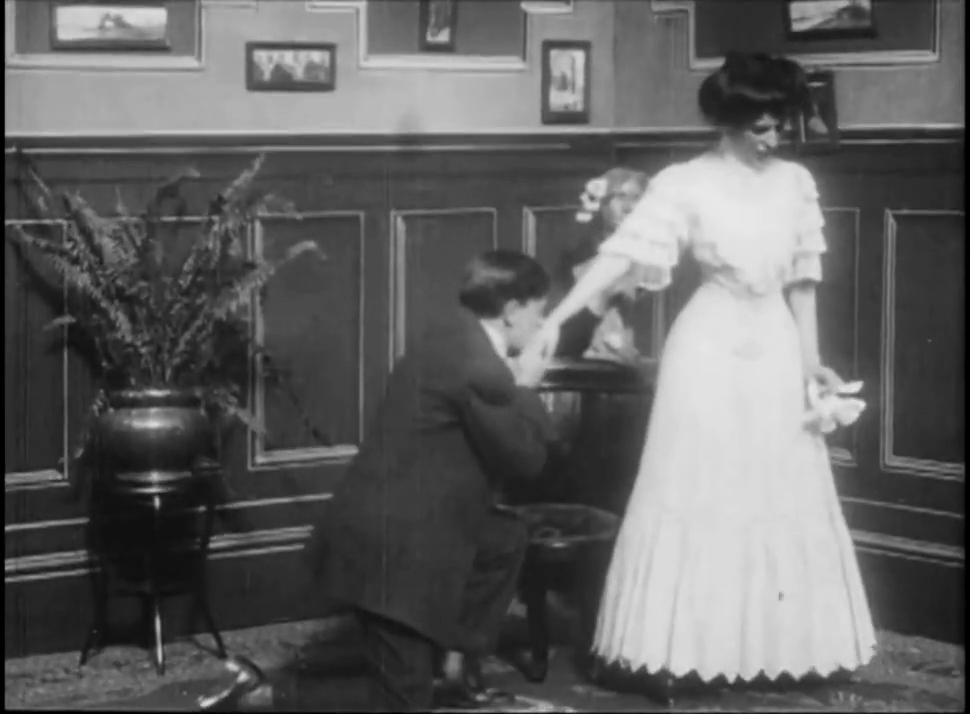
Shot 1

The film was produced by the Edison Manufacturing Company, and directed by Edwin S. Porter. It was shot in the new Edison studio in the Bronx in the summer of 1907 and released in the United States on December 7, 1907.

== Analysis ==
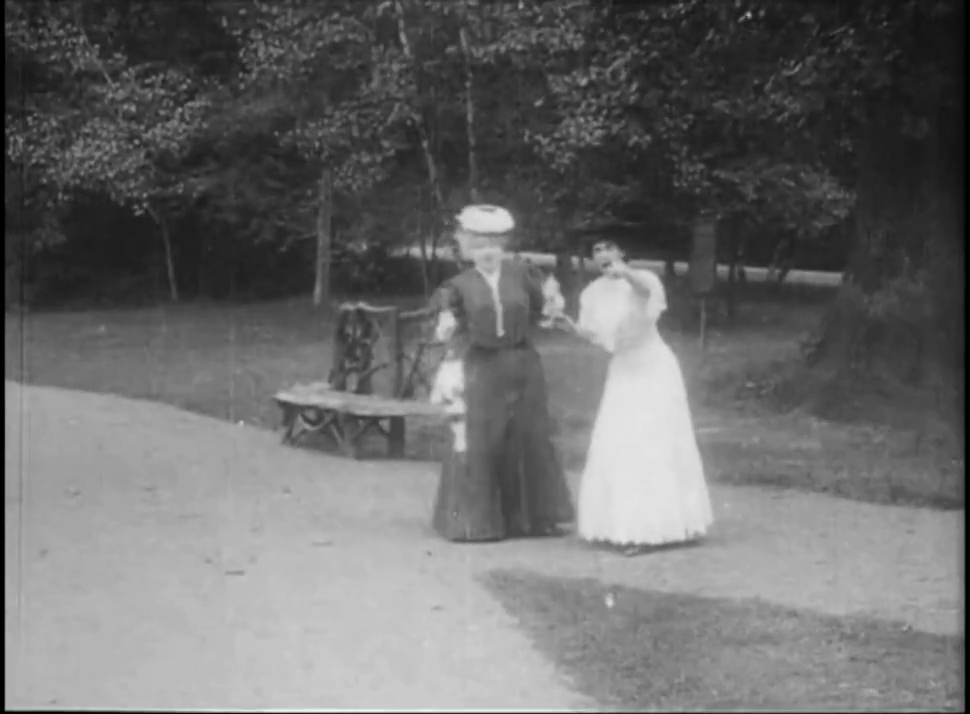
Shot 2

The film is composed of five shots including a split-screen shot representing a telephone conversation.

1. Full shot in a parlour. The man kneels down and offers a ring to the woman.

2. Wide shot in a park. The man walks by flirting with another woman. The woman walking with her mother sees him.

3. The man's parlour. The man is sitting down. He gets up and goes to answer the phone.

4. The man and the woman on the phone on opposite sides of the screen in circular vignettes with a model of a city between them, and their conversation animated with text that moves between them.

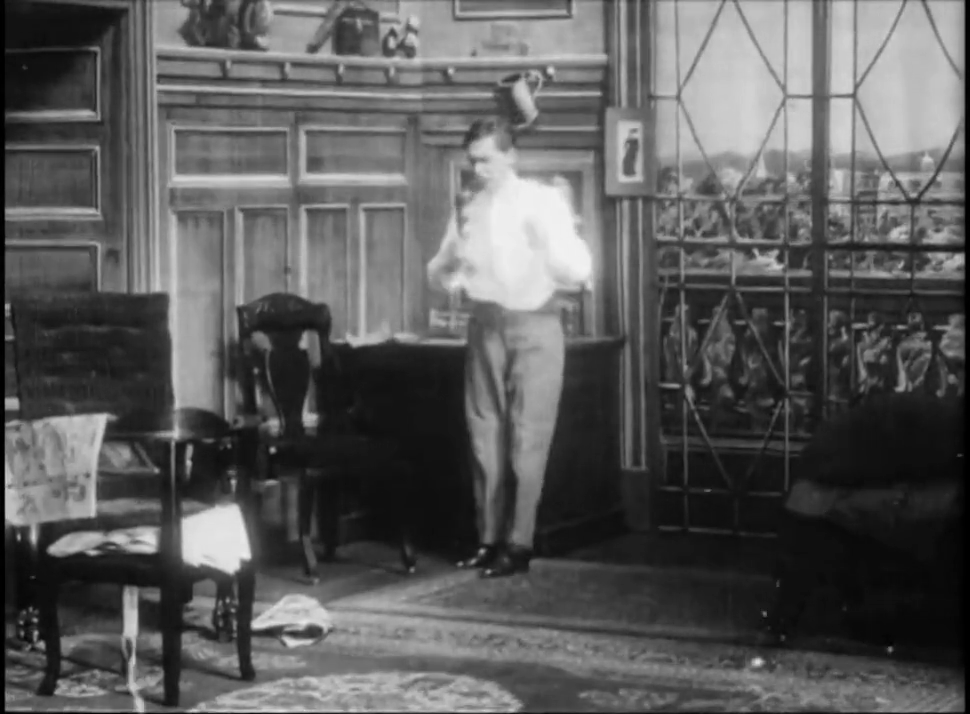
Shot 3

5. Other view of the man's parlour. A college friend pretends to be the sister, creating various quid pro quo with the fiancée and her family.

André Gaudreault notes that the film has several shortcomings: it "has a complicated story to tell in one reel and in some ways lacks sufficient means to tell it. The main part of the story is told in a very lengthy shot of the characters in the college rooms filmed in long shot, as if we were looking at a stage set." As a result, one "can scarcely observe the facial expressions of the actors [...] and only the broadest of gestures are used." He considers that this "avoidance of the shock of the cut to another shot [...] [is] a reflex of the older style now about to give way to quite a different one." On the other hand, he notes that way the film uses cross-dressing is at the limit of what could be acceptable material for comedy when "the father of the girl is drawn to the cross-dressing young man masquerading as the 'sister' and carries on a suggestive flirtation until caught up by his wife." He also identifies this film as an early example of the use in cinema of a telephone conversation to carry "an important part of the narrative." He notes as a clever touch the way in which "the letters express the emotions in the conversation: when the lovers quarrel, the letters meet and crash in mid-screen." but considers that the split-screen representation of the telephone call "shows the resistance of [...] Porter to the concept of alternating edits between distant spaces, which soon [would] become the common way to portray telephone conversations and, more generally, to represent the various threads of a narrative."

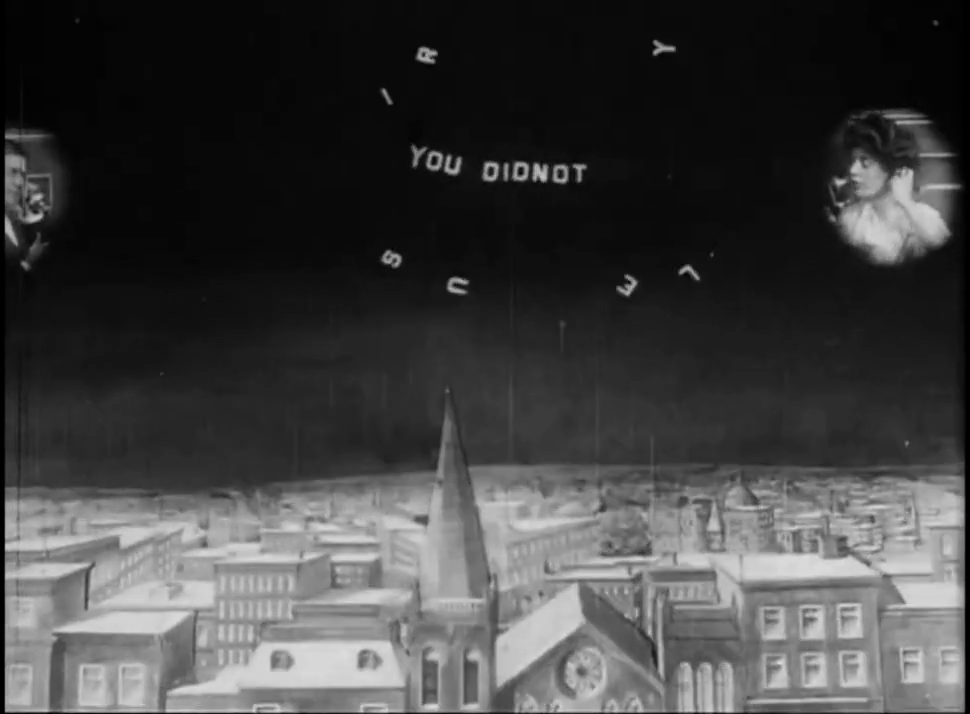
Shot 4

Michael Frierson considers that when staging "a telephone conversation graphically, with a man and a woman on opposite sides of the screen in circular vignettes, the distance between them depicted as illustration of a city scape seen from above, and their conversation animated with text that moves between them, Porter [...] is looking backward to lantern slides and strip cartoons for visual codes to delineate the scene and make it visibly concrete, a single image compositing the speakers, their spatial relationship, and their dialogue shown in animated text."

Bernard Perron refers to this film to illustrate his theory of "transi-sounds", i.e. representation of sounds used for transition in silent films: "Inside irises positioned at the extremities of the frame and placed above the image of a city, a couple is seen conversing on the telephone. To express their exchange, Porter animates letters, which seem to drift in the air toward the man and the woman, creating a wave connecting the interlocutors. This is a lovely example of a literal transi-sound!"

== See also ==
- Edwin S. Porter filmography
