= Nervy Nat Kisses the Bride =

- Directed by: Edwin S. Porter
- Produced by: Thomas Edison
- Distributed by: Edison Manufacturing Company
- Release date: September 30, 1904
- Running time: 2 minutes
- Country: United States
- Language: English

Nervy Nat Kisses the Bride is a 1904 silent comedy short film produced by Thomas Edison and directed by Edwin S. Porter and preserved from a paper print in the Library of Congress. The film was copyrighted as Nervy Nat Kisses the Bride, but sold as "Weary Willie". Another 1904 Porter short was released called "Weary Willie" Kidnaps a Child.

== Plot summary ==
Nervy Nat Kisses the Bride, silent film by Edwin S. Porter, 1904

Weary enters a railroad depot, finding a sleeping farmer. He reaches into the farmer's coat and steals a train ticket. Weary enters the train, and finds a bride and groom making out in a passenger coach. He sits down behind them. The groom leaves, upsetting the bride. Weary moves to sit down beside the bride, who screams once Weary begins to touch her. The groom returns, with the conductor and the porter close behind. Weary is removed from the passenger coach and thrown off the back of the train. He begins to walk down the railroad tracks, turning around briefly to curse the train.

== Cast ==
- Francis Wilson (uncredited)
- Arthur Byron (uncredited)

== See also ==
- Edwin S. Porter filmography
