= Faust and Marguerite (1900 film) =

- Full movie
- Directed by: Edwin S. Porter
- Production company: Edison Manufacturing Company
- Release date: February 28, 1900
- Running time: 57 seconds
- Country: USA
- Language: Silent

Faust and Marguerite is a 1900 American silent trick film produced and distributed by Edison Manufacturing Company. It was directed by Edwin S. Porter and based on the Michel Carré play Faust et Marguerite and the 1859 opera Faust adapted from the play by Charles Gounod.

== Plot ==
The 1901 Edison Films Catalog describes the film:

Marguerite is seated before the fireplace, Faust standing by her side. Mephistopheles enters and offers his sword to Faust, commanding him to behead the fair Marguerite. Faust refuses, whereupon Mephistopheles draws the sword across the throat of the lady and she suddenly disappears and Faust is seated in her place.
