= A Night of Terror (1911 film) =

1911 film by Edwin S. Porter

A Night of Terror is a 1911 American silent film comedy directed by Edwin S. Porter. It was released by Edison Manufacturing Company as a split reel with the film The Old Family Bible.

== Plot ==
A traveler fears his ax-wielding innkeeper, but he's just killing a chicken for supper.
