= Kathleen Mavourneen (1906 film) =

1906 American silent drama film

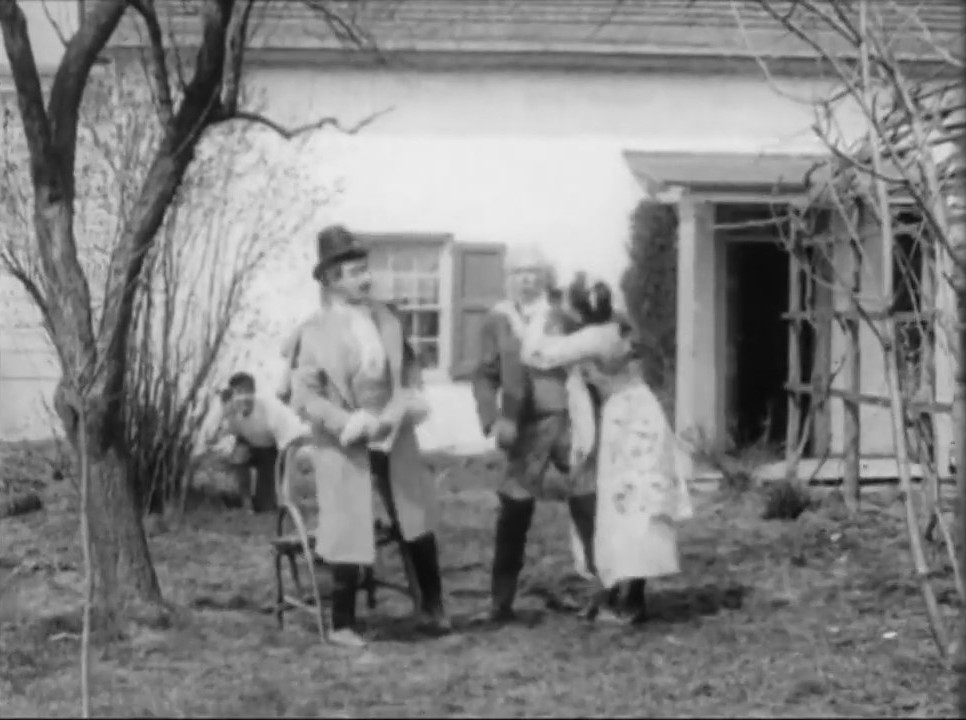
- Screenshot: Kathleen Mavourneen (1906 film)
- Directed by: Edwin S. Porter
- Based on: Kathleen Mavourneen, play by Dion Boucicault
- Starring: Kitty O'Neil; Walter Griswoll; H.L. Bascomb
- Cinematography: Edwin S. Porter
- Production company: Edison Manufacturing Company
- Release date: August 1906
- Running time: 15 min.
- Country: United States
- Language: Silent

Kathleen Mavourneen is a 1906 silent short film by Edwin S. Porter, produced and distributed by Edison Manufacturing Company. It is based on the song “Kathleen Mavourneen” by Annie Crawford and Frederick Williams Nichols Crouch, which inspired the play by Dion Boucicault.

== Plot ==
Captain Clearfield, a wealthy Irish landlord and head of a gang of outlaws, assaults Kathleen with the help of an accomplice, but her fiancé, Terence O'More, arrives in time to break up the attack. Clearfield then tries to get his way by intimidating Kathleen and her father, but again help arrives in time.

Clearfield and his accomplice then decide to abduct her and burn down their cottage. Terence manages to discover the criminals' den where Kathleen is being kept captive and rescues her. The whole village celebrates, as Kathleen and Terence get married.

== Analysis ==
The film is composed of 18 shots. All shots are wide shots with a static camera (except a slight pan in shot 1). Most of the shots are filmed on location and only one stage set is used to show the bandits' hideout. The film gives a feeling of authenticity thanks to on location filming and the inclusion of details such as the peasants stopping their work to pray when they hear the church bells ringing the angelus, a scene which seems inspired by Jean-François Millet's 1859 painting, The Angelus. The fim includes a chase scene which uses five shots with efficient continuity editing.

1. A watermill. Kathleen is sitting by the waterfall. Clearfield enters with Dugan and attempts to kiss Kathleen by force but Terence enters running and punches him in the face.

2. A road in the forest. A group of bandits prepare an ambush. When the carriage of Kathleen and her father arrive, the bandits attack them and steal their money.

3. The bandits' hideout. Clearfield receives the stolen money and distributes it to his men.

4. A garden in front of a cottage. Kathleen is sitting on a chair when Clearfield enters and starts courting her. When she rejects him, he shows her an order of eviction and enters the house to give it to her father. Four soldiers arrive but when they try to evict Kathleen and her father they are chased away by a crowd of villagers.

5. A country road. The villagers continue chasing the soldiers.

6. A country road with a wall. The chase continues, with all participants climbing over the wall.

7. The chases continues down a slope in a forest.

8. The bank of a river. The chase finally concludes when the soldiers are thrown into the river and swim away.

9. The parlor of the house of Kathleen and her father. Kathleen and her father are seated in the parlor. Kathleen’s father then goes into an adjoining room.

Clearfield and Dugan enter the parlor. Clearfield again tries to embrace Kathleen, who is repulsed. Dugan then seizes and chloroforms her. At this moment her father appears in the doorway. Clearfield rushes at the old man, knocking him down, and carries Kathleen out of the house.

10. Other view of the parlor. Dugan lights some branches at the hearth, and sets fire to the room in which Kathleen's father lies unconscious, and then hurriedly leaves the house.

Fortunately, Terence O'More discovers the fire and rushes into the house. He discovers his future father-in-law unconscious in the burning room. After being driven back by the dense smoke two or three times, he throws a table cloth over his head, dashes into the burning room and carries Kathleen's father to safety.

11. A model of the exterior of the cottage is rapidly consumed by the flames.

12. A river bank with a man waiting next to a rowing boat. Clearfield and Dugan enter carrying unconscious Kathleen. They load her on the boat just before Terence, who was running behind them, can catch them.

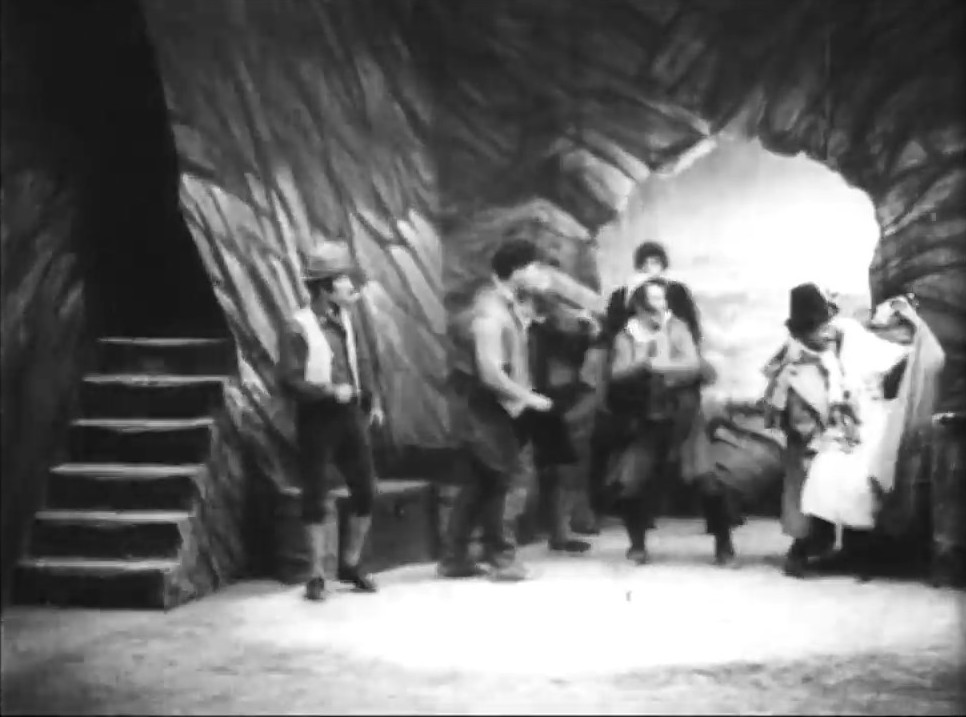
Shot 13

13. Same as shot 3. Kathleen is carried unconscious into the bandits' den. When she regains consciousness she tries unsuccessfully to escape.

14. A clearing in the forest. An cloaked old woman is pouring something from a little bottle into a large bottle. One of the bandits smells the contents of the bottle and tells the old lady to follow him.

15. Same as shot 3. The bandits drink from the bottle and fall unconscious. The cloaked old woman reveals to Kathleen that she is actually Terence in disguise and they manage to escape after a fight with more bandits.

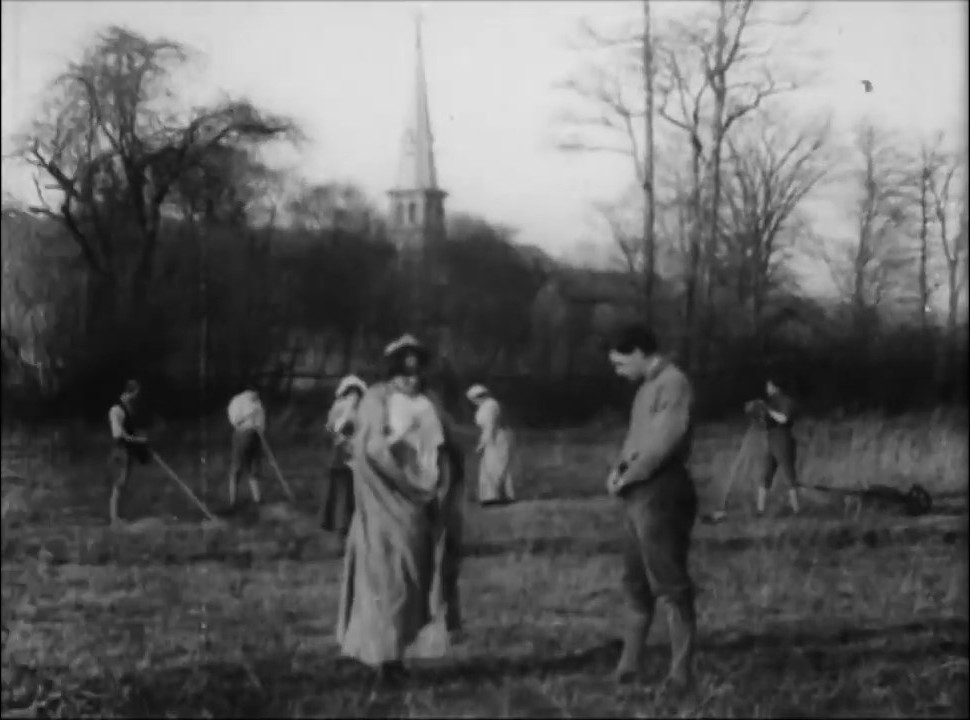
Shot 16

16. A field with a group of peasants working. Terence and Kathleen come in running and are welcomed by the peasants. They stop for a prayer when they hear the church bells ringing from the angelus.

17. A village square with a group of peasants, including Kathleen and Terence, dancing.

18. A village church with a group of children on the stairs. Kathleen is holding Terence's arm as they walk to the door of the church. As they slowly walk down the stairs, they are followed by their guests, the children who throw petals of flowers.

This film has been quoted as an example of the limitations of silent films to express complex narratives without intertitles. One option used by many travelling exhibitors was to have a lecture accompanying the film. Another was to use sound effects. Shot 16, where Kathleen and Terence are walking through a field before stopping and standing still for a few seconds with bowed head becomes easier to understand when the sound of a tolling church bell is heard at this moment.

Film historian Charles Musser wrote of Porter's adaptation, "O'More not only rescues Kathleen from the villain but, through marriage, renews the family for another generation."

== Cast ==
- Kitty O'Neil as Kathleen
- Walter Griswoll as Terence O’More
- H.L. Bascomb as Captain Clearfield
- W.R. Floyd as Dugan
- E.M. Leslie as David O’Connor
- N.B. Clarke as Father O’Cassidy
- J. McDovall as Danny O’Lavey
- C.F. Seabert as Black Rody
- D.R. Allen as Red Barney
- D.J. McGinnis as Darby Doyle
- W.F. Borroughs as Dennis O’Gaff

== See also ==
- Edwin S. Porter filmography
