= The European Rest Cure =

1904 American silent comedy film

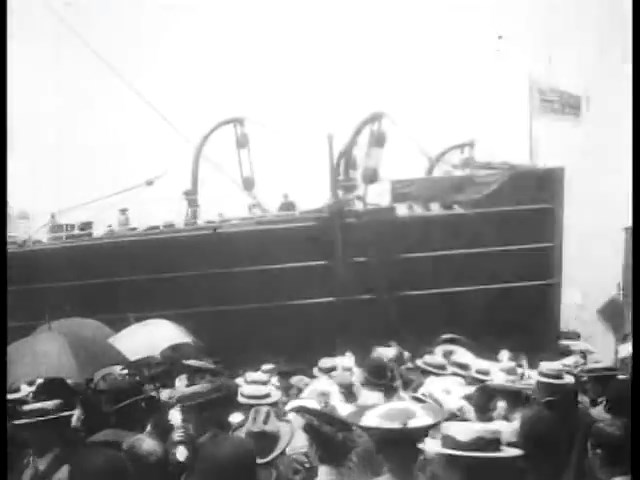
- Screenshot: The protagonist's ship leaving New York
- Directed by: Edwin S. Porter
- Starring: Joseph Hart
- Production company: Edison Manufacturing Company
- Release date: September 1904
- Running time: 13 min.
- Country: United States
- Language: English

The European Rest Cure, also known as European Rest Cure, is a 1904 American silent comedy film, directed by Edwin S. Porter partly filmed on location in New York.

== Plot ==
The European Rest Cure (1904)

The film tells the story of an old American man who has a series of misadventures while touring Europe. After leaving New York on a steamer (RMS Etruria), he is seasick during a storm before arriving in Europe. In Ireland, he falls from a wall while attempting to kiss the Blarney Stone. In Paris, he is drawn to dance the can-can with two enterprising women. In the Alps, he falls into a crevasse. In Italy, while viewing antique ruins, he is relieved of his valuables by some bandits. In Egypt (regarded as part of Europe for the purposes of the film), he falls down while climbing a pyramid in Giza, and he is finally submitted to an energetic massage in a mud bath in Germany. When he is back home, he is so exhausted that he is no longer able to walk alone.

== Analysis ==
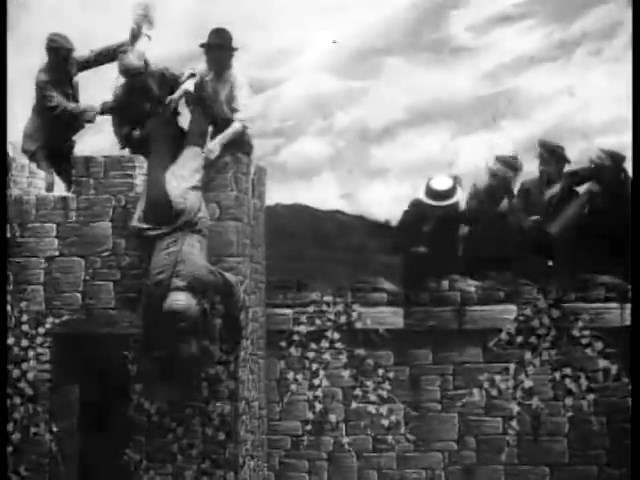
Kissing the Blarney Stone

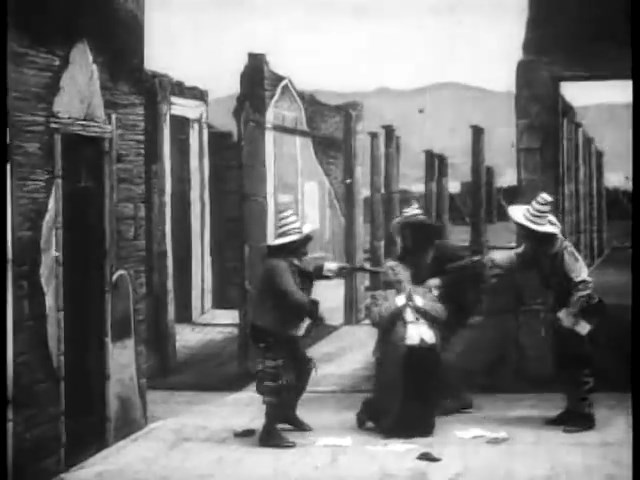
Hold up in Italy

The film is composed of 12 shots, all but one introduced by an intertitle (in italics below):

1. All aboard. Panning shot of the protagonist boarding the ship and saying goodbye to two women.
2. Au revoir. Crowd of people waving at a departing ship. First we seen the ship moving then the camera pans to follow the ship, giving the impression that the waving crowd is moving.
3. Panning view of Manhattan seen from the Hudson.
4. Dropping the pilot. The camera pans down to follow the pilot descending the accommodation ladder.
5. The storm. Inside a cabin. The protagonist is seasick. Oscillating camera. Water coming in through the pothole.
6. Kissing the Blarney Stone. Stage set of an old wall symbolising Blarney castle in Ireland. The protagonist bends over the wall and falls down when he wants to kiss the stone.
7. Doing Paris. A set figuring the terrasse of a Paris café with two women sitting at a table to the left, one man at a table to the right. The protagonist enters and want to sit with the man but the women waive at him and he sits with them. After a few drinks, the three dance a cancan. He is finally taken away by the guide as one of the women dances on the table.
8. Climbing the Alps. A stage set of snowy mountains. A group of tourists including the protagonist are helped by guides to climb rocks. The protagonist falls into a crevasse and is pulled up with ropes.
9. Hold up, in Italy. A stage set of antique ruins. The protagonist enters with a guide and a group of tourists. As he stays behind to gaze at a detail, he is attacked by a gang of outlaws. He begs them for mercy.
10. Climbing the pyramids of Egypt. A stage set with the basis of a pyramid to the left foreground and two other pyramids and the sphinx as backdrop. Two natives sitting down get up when a guide arrives with a group of tourists. The protagonist and other tourists climb the pyramid with the help of the natives, but he soon falls down to the ground.
11. Mud Baths of Germany. A stage set with a large wooden bucket at the foreground and a forest as backdrop. The protagonist enters and is brutally thrown into the bucket by two attendants and covered with mud before being splashed by buckets of cold water.
12. Home sweet home. A large door with a waiting hackney coach. The protagonist exits through the door, supported by a man and a woman and boards the coach.

There is a strong contrast between the four first shots, which constitute the departure scene, and the rest of the film. These very realistic shots are filmed on location in New York Harbor with horizontal panning in shots 1 and 2, a tracking shot of Manhattan taken from a boat in shot 3 and vertical panning in shot 4. All other shots are filmed by a fixed camera and, with the exception of the last one, use stylised stage sets.

Bertram M. Gordon has noted that the film is an indication of the increasing popularity of Europe and the Mediterranean as a destination for American tourists at the beginning of the 20th century.

The film has also been mentioned as one of the earliest parodic travelogues. The comic effect is based on the clumsiness of the protagonist and on caricatural stereotypes of European nationalities. Jon Gartenberg has stressed the novelty of the camera movements, in particular the panorama of the waterfront from the departing ship. The caricatural nature of the film has also been stressed by several authors, notably how "Irish stereotypical characters" are depicted during the first stop of the tourists in Europe the way in which "a group of picturesquely dressed locals rob (the protagonist) during his visit to Pompeii", or the energetic massage received at a German bath house.

== See also ==
- Edwin S. Porter filmography
