= The Little Train Robbery =

1905 film

- Directed by: Edwin S. Porter
- Cinematography: Edwin S. Porter
- Production companies: Thomas A. Edison, Inc.
- Release date: September 1, 1905

The Little Train Robbery is a 1905 American silent Western film directed by Edwin S. Porter. It is a parodic sequel/remake to Porter's 1903 film The Great Train Robbery with an all-child "cast as the robbers, and a miniature railroad and playhouse as sets."

== Plot ==
The Little Train Robbery (1905)

The film opens inside the robbers' den, its walls decorated with portraits of notorious criminals and illustrations of famous bandit exploits. Some members of the gang lounge idly while others read novels and illustrated papers. Despite their youthful appearance, all are dressed as typical Western desperados. The "Bandit Queen," the gang’s leader, enters with a blindfolded new recruit. He is sworn in at gunpoint and, after the blindfold is removed, receives congratulations and handshakes from the gang. The Bandit Queen calls for volunteers to hold up a train, selects seven members, and sends them out.

The next scene shows the gang breaking into a barn to steal ponies, which they ride to a strategic bend in the railroad that runs along a steep embankment. They block the tracks with cross ties and hide in nearby bushes. When the train arrives, the engineer disembarks to remove the obstruction, but a bandit sneaks up and knocks him unconscious with an axe. The gang surrounds the train and robs the passengers, seizing “valuables” such as candy and dolls. They uncouple the engine and a single car to make their escape, narrowly avoiding a posse of police arriving on the scene.

Further up the tracks, the robbers abandon the engine and car, retreating into the woods before returning to their den. Believing they have escaped, they begin dividing the loot. Meanwhile, the police, informed by the passengers, follow the gang’s trail. As the robbers divide their plunder, a sentry spots the approaching officers. The gang flees the cabin, leaving everything behind. Pursued on foot, they dash through tall weeds, over a bridge, and up a steep hill.

At a pond, the police close in. Some robbers jump into the water, while two hesitate and are captured. After a chase involving boats, the entire gang is captured following a brief struggle, during which one officer is dragged into the water. The final scene shows the bedraggled gang tied together and led away by the police, who are heavily armed with the captured weapons. In a closing twist, a confederate emerges from the woods, cuts the rope, and rescues the Bandit Queen.

== Production ==
The film was shot in Olympia Park, near Connellsville, Pennsylvania during August, 1905. As part of the parody of his own prior work, Porter utilized miniature trains and playhouses as the sets. Other alterations to the core story involved the robbers stealing dolls and candy, and ultimately being caught by police officers.

== Distribution ==
The film was released to the public in 1905 by the Edison Manufacturing Company and the Kleine Optical Company.

== See also ==
- Edwin S. Porter filmography
