= The Trainer's Daughter; or, A Race for Love =

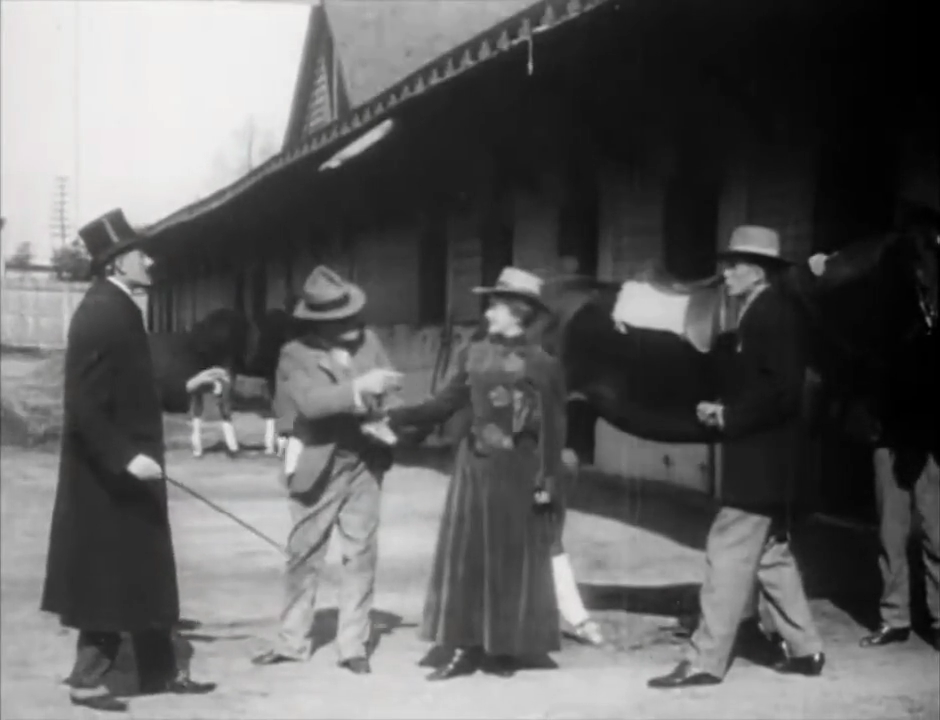
- The Trainer's Daughter; or, A Race for Love, shot 1
- Directed by: James Searle Dawley; Edwin S. Porter
- Starring: Edward Boulden; Miss DeVarney; William Sorelle
- Production company: Edison Manufacturing Company
- Release date: November 23, 1907
- Running time: 14 minutes
- Country: United States
- Language: Silent film

The Trainer's Daughter; or, A Race for Love is an American silent film directed by James Searle Dawley and Edwin S. Porter, and produced by the Edison Manufacturing Company.

== Plot summary ==
Jack, owner of a racehorse, and the daughter of a horse trainer are in love. The trainer would rather have his daughter marry Delmar, the owner of a whole stable. Jack and Delmar enters into a wager concerning the outcome of a race in which they both have horses competing and the trainer's daughter agrees to marry the winner. Delmar realises that his horse cannot beat Jack's and he bribes a stable boy to dope Jack's horse, a plan Jack's jockey overhears. The jockey attempts to intervene, but Delmar and the stable boy overcome him and hide him in a deserted house. The jockey manages to escape but is not in any condition to ride. The trainer's daughter convinces Jack to let her take the jockey's place and she wins the race.

== Cast ==
- Edward Boulden
- Miss DeVarney
- William Sorelle
- Mr. Sullivan

== Production and release ==
The film was loosely based on Theodore Kremer's 1904 play A Race for Life. It was produced by the Edison Manufacturing Company, and directed by James Searle Dawley and Edwin S. Porter. It was released in the United States on November 23, 1907.

== Analysis ==
The film is composed of 19 shots without any intertitles. In the surviving copy, the last shot is missing and is replaced by a still photograph.

1. In front of a racehorse stable. Jack is talking to his jockey. The trainer arrive with Delmar. They agree to a wager. The trainer's daughter arrives and gives her agreement. Jack's jockey leave on his horse. Camera panning to the right.

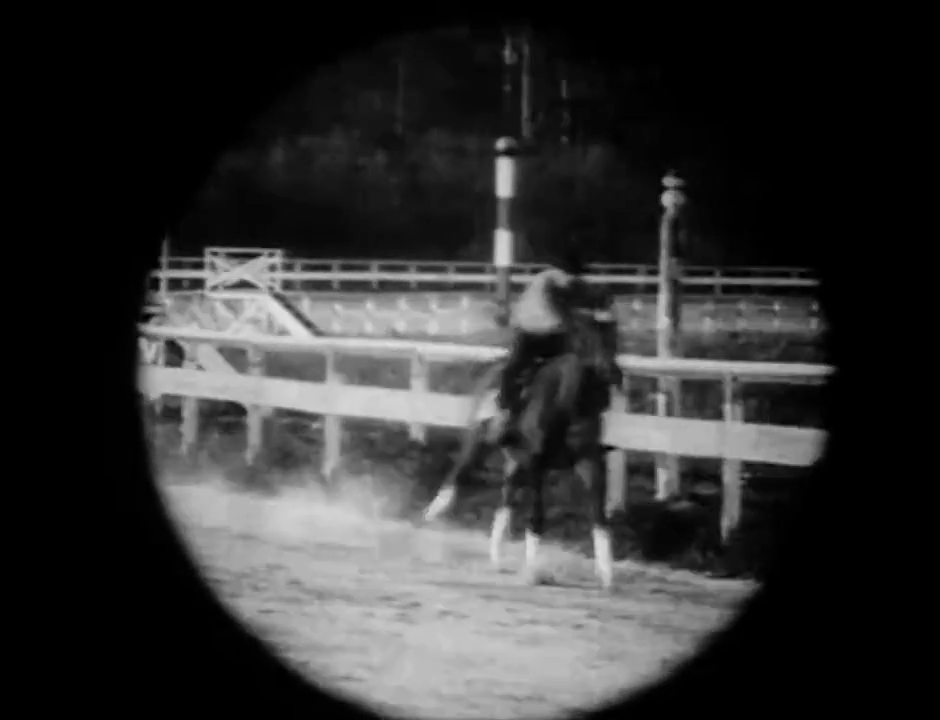
The Trainer's Daughter or A Race for Love, shot 3

2. The paddock of a racetrack. Delmar enters and take his binoculars.

3. Iris panning shot of the racetrack with Jack's horse racing.

4. Same as 2. Delmar looks worried and leaves the paddock.

5. Same as 1, closer to the facade. Jack's jockey brings back his horse to the stable. Delmar talks to a stable hand without noticing that Jack's jockey overhears the conversation.

6. Inside the stable. Jack's jockey moves his horse in another stall. When he hears Delmar and his accomplice, he hides in a trunk. Delmar's accomplice is going to give a powder to a horse but Delmar sees that it is not Jack's. The jockey comes out of the trunk and starts a fight with the stable hand. He has the upper hand but Delmar knocks him out from behind. They carry him away.

7. The facade of a wooden shack. The camera pans right to follow Delmar and his accomplice carrying the jockey. They hide him inside the shack.

8. A garden with the statue of a horse and various buildings. Delmar tries to woo the trainer's daughter but she rejects him.

9. Same as 7. The jockey comes out of the window. He makes a few uncertain steps before falling on the grounds but he manages to get up and staggers out.

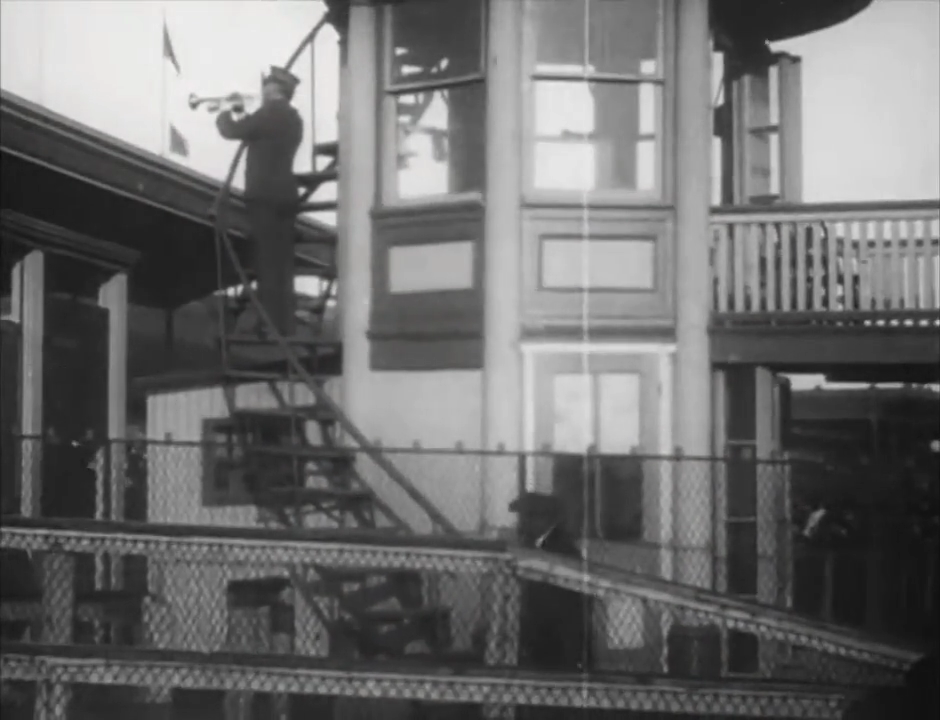
The Trainer's Daughter or A Race for Love, shot 11

10. A staircase next to the racetrack. Delmar talks to his jockey. Jack, the trainer and his daughter enter. A group of jockeys come down the stairs but Jack's jockey is nowhere to be found. He finally arrives, hardly able to remain standing and points accusingly at Delmar. The trainer's daughter exchanges a few words with Jack and runs upstairs.

11. The racetrack control tower. A man sounds a bugle.

12. Same as 10. The trainer's daughter rushes down the stairs, dressed as a jockey. She shakes hands with Jack and the jockey lying on a stretcher and rushes out towards the racetrack.

13. Other view of the paddock. Jack helps the trainer's daughter to get on the horse and she exits right.

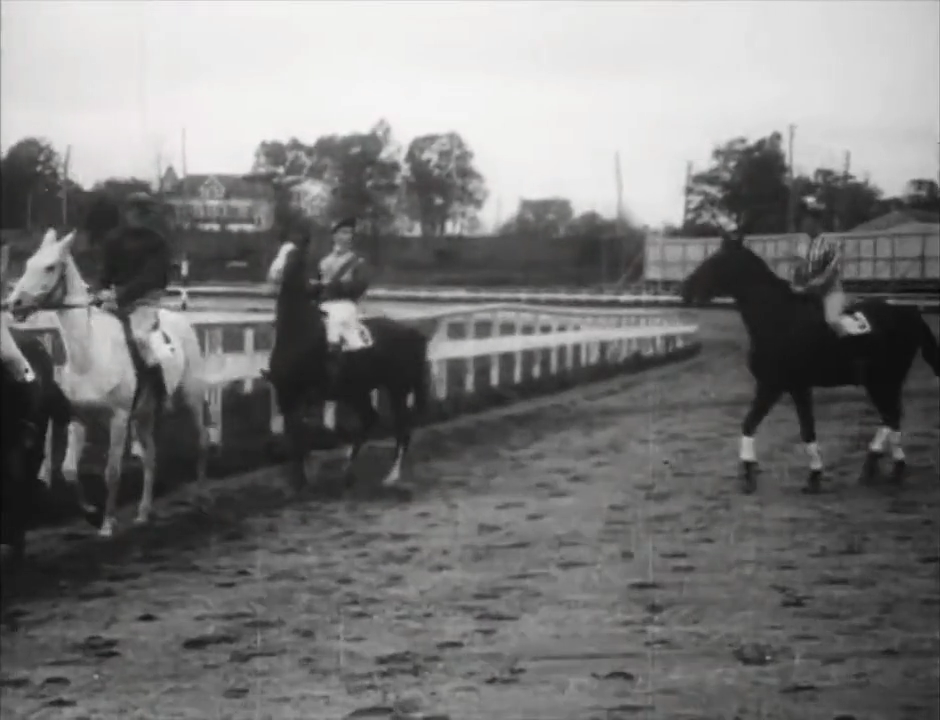
The Trainer's Daughter or A Race for Love, shot 14

14. The racetrack. The horses go towards the start line and he trainer's daughter join them.

15. The start-line. The race begins.

16 and 17. The camera pans to follow the racing horses.

18. The horses leave the racetrack. The trainer's daughter raises her arms in sign of victory and gets off her horse.

19. Missing shot replaced by a photograph. Medium shot of Jack and the trainer's daughter with the head of the horse between them.

Several authors have mentioned this film as an important, if imperfect, stage in the development of film melodramas in America. After initial endeavours by Edwin Porter which "were too brief to allow developed stories", such as Life of an American Fireman or The Great Train Robbery, this film "moved even closer to the classic melodramatic form, employing the conventional triangle of ingenue, favored beau and jealous villain, and climaxing in a thrilling scene involving the young woman courageousness." It is also one of the first examples of what Edward Branigan has termed the "double causal structure": "the couple's romance and the intrigue surrounding the horse race depicted in the film's central section intertwine so as to become interdependent. Accordingly, the doubling of causal mechanisms reinforces the motivation of the central character."

Various innovative elements have been noted, notably the use of a point-of-view shot between two shots of Delmar looking through his binoculars (shots 2 to 4). The film has also been mentioned as an early example of parallel editing in shots 10 to 12 with "a cut from the characters in a stable preparing for a race to the man blowing a horn to signal the start returning afterwards to the interior of the stable". This cross-cutting has also been noted as an example of a silent film where an "intradiegetic sound encroachment plays an important role [...]. In this case, the comprehension of the link between spaces much farther apart from each other is made possible by the use of the cornet."

The film has also been mentioned as a precursor with respect to cross-cutting used to enhance the suspense of "last-minute rescue narrative": between shots 6 and 10, the film shows the parallel development of the jockey's action on the one hand and Jack and the trainer's daughter on the other.

On the other hand, authors have noted that this film is characteristic of a problem faced by producers of dramatic films circa 1907: ensuring that the story is understood by viewers without "using extradiegetic means during projection to facilitate comprehension of the narrative." In this case, "the narrative's relative complexity outstrips the representational system employed to mount it. [...] replicating the methods of the stage – for example, by mounting extended tableaux of gesticulations by actors shot from a considerable distance – could only result in audience incomprehension."

John L. Fell considers that while the film gives a rather conventional evolution of plot conventions, there is "too little time clearly to explicate the relationships", as a consequence, the film "gives a cloudy picture of actual attitudes shared among father, daughter, boyfriend, jockey, and villain."

This problem is compounded by the fact that the film does not use any intertitles. An edited version with added intertitles shows that only a few of them are sufficient to make the action understandable.

== See also ==
- Edwin S. Porter filmography
