= The Kleptomaniac =

1904 American silent drama film

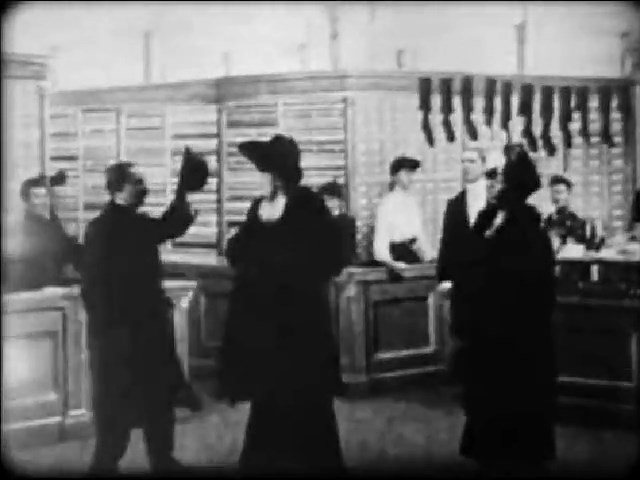
- Screenshot: The Kleptomaniac caught in a department store
- Directed by: Edwin S. Porter
- Starring: Aline Boyd; Ann Eggleston; William S. Rising
- Cinematography: Edwin S. Porter
- Production company: Edison Manufacturing Company
- Release date: February 1905
- Running time: 10 min.
- Country: United States
- Language: English intertitles

The Kleptomaniac is a 1905 American silent drama film directed by Edwin S. Porter, and it was partly filmed on location in New-York. The film denounces the discriminatory treatment of the poor by the justice system. It is both one of the first American social drama and one of the first Courtroom drama.

== Plot ==
The film contrasts the story of two women: The first, a well-dressed lady, leaves her elegant building and is taken in her carriage to a department store. While she is in the store, she steals several items, and is caught by store detectives. The second, a poor woman with two small children, steals a loaf of bread out of desperation, and is quickly caught and arrested.

Both women are taken to the police station and then into court, where a judge expeditiously deals with various defendants. The rich lady is quickly released with the help of her lawyer and embraces her husband while the poor woman is condemned despite the supplications of her little daughter.

== Analysis ==
The film is composed of 11 shots, each introduced by an intertitle (in italics below)(*note: not all prints of this film have the intertitles):

1. Leaving home. Diagonal view of a street. A lady dressed in black comes out of a luxury building. [pan right] and boards a hackney coach which departs.

2. Arriving at store. Diagonal view of a street with the door of Macy's department store. A hackney coach stops in front of the door. The lady in black alights, and the camera pans left to follow her as she enters the department store.

3. Interior of department store. Counters filled with customers, saleswomen and a male manager. The lady in black is shown with several items. When the saleswoman is not watching, the lady in black puts something in her muff. She does it a second time, however, she is seen by a detective who asks the lady in black to follow him.

4. Superintendent's office. An office with a man standing with his secretary. The lady in black is brought in by the detective and the stolen objects are taken out of her muff.

5. Leaving store. Same street as Shot #2. The lady in black comes out of the door and is accompanied by the detective. The camera pans right as they both board a hackney coach.

6. Home of thief. A room with a poor woman sitting prostrated at a table and a child sitting on the floor. A young girl enters and kisses her mother who puts on a scarf on her head, the mother kisses the child and leaves.

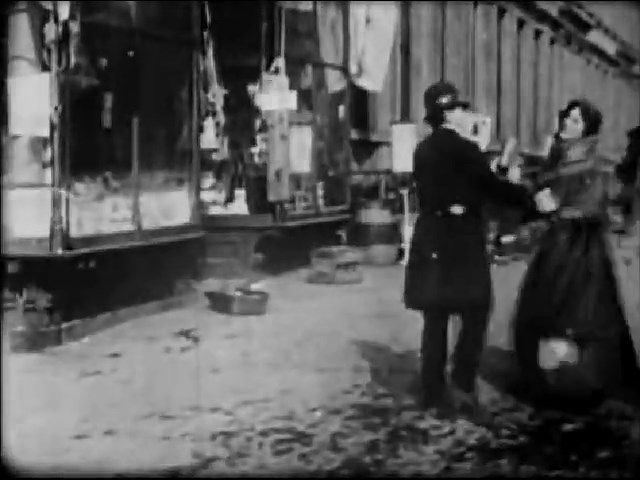
The poor woman being arrested

7. Stealing bread. Diagonal view of the corner of a street with a shop. An apprentice is called by his boss and leaves a basket of bread in front of the shop. The poor woman takes a piece of bread from the basket and tries to leave. However, she is caught by the shopkeeper who calls a policeman. The policeman takes the woman away.

8. Arriving at the police station. A street covered in snow with a large building. The hackney coach seen in Shot #5 arrives and stops in front of the camera, which then pans to the right to follow the lady in black as she is accompanied into the police station.

9. Arriving at police station in patrol wagon. Same view as shot #8. A patrol car arrives and stops before the building. The camera pans right to follow the poor woman, who is taken inside by the policeman.

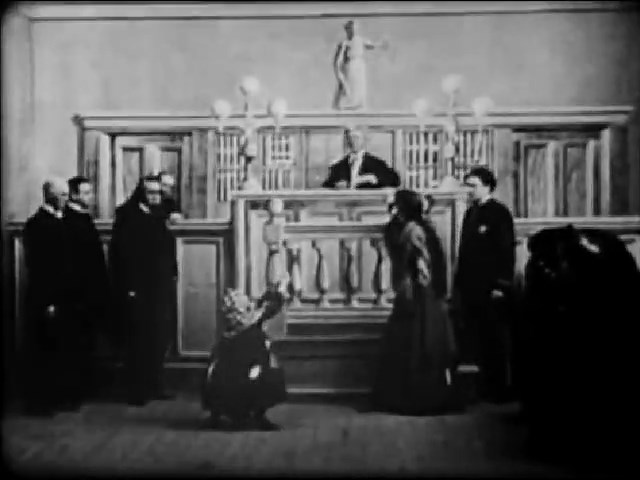
Courtroom scene

10. Court room scene. Several defendants are brought in and the judge expeditiously delivers his sentences. The poor woman is brought in and tries to defend her case while the shopkeeper accuses her. The poor woman’s daughter kneels down to implore the judge. Her mother takes her daughter in her arms but she is torn away from her. The lady in black faces the accusation of the saleswoman and starts crying while her lawyer defends her. The judge rejects the accusation and the lady in black embraces her husband.

11. Tableaux. Justice as a half blindfolded woman holding a pair of scales where a bag of gold weighs more than a piece of bread.

All shots are wide or full shots which make it sometimes difficult for viewers to follow the action, notably in shot #3. The outdoor shots were filmed in New-York and show snow covered street filmed diagonally with a great depth of field and with camera panning to follow the characters.

Charles Musser considers that this is Porter's most radical film because of the way it condemns the class bias of government and justice. The fact that the rich lady is mentioned in Edison's catalog as Mrs. Banker implies that in the same way as she steals in the department store, her husband the banker steals from his clients. Porter implies that a socioeconomic system in which two essential values, familial responsibility and honesty, are in conflict needs to be reevaluated.

Matthias Kuzina regards the film as a precursor of contemporary social problem films, concerning "the nature of class conflict in America and the subjugation of the interests of the poor in general and the impotence of the individual in particular".

For Kay Sloan, the film offers "a scathing portrait of the American legal system and its treatment of the poor. (...) Court scenes (...) resembled a virtual assembly line of justice - as marshals herded the accused before the judge like so many cattle. Yet the wealthy were brushed out of the courtroom with a sympathetic wave of the hand." She considers that the film suggests that the nation's criminaloids (a term used by sociologist Edward A. Ross in 1907 to designate those taking advantage of their positions of power) "stretched even to those in judicial robes". She notes however that the film was not regarded as provocative, because the message implied that the powerless "would remain passive victims of greed and injustice".

The structure of the film with the cross-cutting between two parallel stories and the allegorical ending has been highlighted by Miriam Hansen as an early example of the way in which in the tradition of silent films, allegorical tendencies are combined with primitive narrative styles, often in conjunction with parallelism. Hansen stresses the innovative use of allegory by Porter in this film by comparing it with D. W. Griffith's Intolerance. While the cradle image in Intolerance embraces the allegorical tradition in its most conservative intentions, Porter on the contrary alienates the familiar representation of Justice as a blindfolded woman holding a horizontal pair of scales by showing the blindfold discovering one eye and the scales tipped.

The film has also been noted as one of the first representing a department store, albeit in a rather negative way.

== See also ==
- Edwin S. Porter filmography
