= Uncle Tom Wins =

Short film released in 1909

- Production company: Edison Studios
- Distributed by: Edison Studios
- Release date: April 30, 1909
- Country: United States
- Language: English

Uncle Tom Wins is a 1909 American film. It was made by Edison Pictures. The film features a modified version of the character of Uncle Tom from Uncle Tom's Cabin; although its plot has nothing in common with that novel. In this film, Uncle Tom wins the lottery and has his hiding place for the loot sought after by thieves. It is a short comedy film incorporating "race humor". Another account describes the film as featuring stereotypical minstrel themes.

== See also ==
- Edwin S. Porter filmography
