= Kathleen Mavourneen (disambiguation) =

Kathleen Mavourneen is an 1837 Irish-themed song written by Annie Crawford and composed by Frederick Crouch.

Kathleen Mavourneen may also refer to:

- Kathleen Mavourneen (play), play by Dion Boucicault
- Kathleen Mavourneen (1913 film), silent short film by Herbert Brenon, based on the play
- Kathleen Mavourneen (1906 film), silent film by Wallace McCutcheon Sr.
- Kathleen Mavourneen (1919 film), silent film by Charles Brabin, starring Theda Bara, based on the play
- Kathleen Mavourneen (1930 film), film by Albert Ray, based on the play
- Kathleen Mavourneen (1937 film), film by Norman Lee, based on a novel by Clara Mulholland
- PS Kathleen Mavourneen, a paddle steamer

== See also ==
- Mavourneen, a 1915 play by Louis N. Parker
