= Terrible Teddy, the Grizzly King =

1901 film by Edwin S. Porter

- Directed by: Edwin S. Porter
- Distributed by: Edison Manufacturing Company
- Release date: February 23, 1901
- Country: United States
- Language: English

Terrible Teddy, the Grizzly King is a 1901 American silent film directed by Edwin S. Porter. Produced by the Edison Manufacturing Company, it is the earliest known political satire in American film. It features three actors, all of whom are unknown.

== Plot ==
Consisting of two shots, the first shot is set in a wood during winter. The actor representing then vice-president Theodore Roosevelt enthusiastically hurries down a hillside towards a tree in the foreground. He falls once, but rights himself and cocks his rifle. Two other men, bearing signs reading "His Photographer" and "His Press Agent" respectively, follow him into the shot; the photographer sets up his camera. "Teddy" aims his rifle upward at the tree and fells what appears to be a common house cat, which he then proceeds to stab. "Teddy" holds his prize aloft, and the press agent takes notes. The second shot is taken in a slightly different part of the wood, on a path. "Teddy" rides the path on his horse towards the camera and out to the left of the shot, followed closely by the press agent and photographer, still dutifully holding their signs.

== Background ==
Terrible Teddy, the Grizzly King was inspired by political cartoons that originally ran in William Randolph Hearst's New York Journal. These cartoons depicted Roosevelt as a macho hunting enthusiast with a strong taste for publicity, killing a mountain lion in Colorado while the press took in the event. The film is based on 1901 New York Journal comics panels that ran on February 4 (first shot) and 18th (second shot) very closely. As the Edison Company filed a copyright for the finished film on February 23, Terrible Teddy, the Grizzly King was likely made quickly. A paper print (LC 1887) was filed with the Library of Congress at the time of copyright; it was later rephotographed to flexible film in order to preserve the subject.

== See also ==
- Edwin S. Porter filmography
