= Uncle Tom's Cabin (1903 film) =

1903 short film by Edwin S. Porter

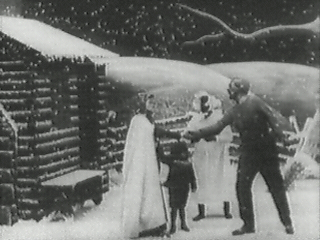
- Directed by: Edwin S. Porter
- Written by: Harriet Beecher Stowe
- Produced by: Edison Manufacturing Company
- Cinematography: Edwin S. Porter
- Release date: August 3, 1903
- Running time: 19 minutes
- Country: United States
- Languages: Silent film English inter-titles

Full film.

Uncle Tom's Cabin is a 1903 American silent short drama directed by Edwin S. Porter and produced by the Edison Manufacturing Company. The film was adapted from the 1852 novel Uncle Tom's Cabin by Harriet Beecher Stowe. The plot streamlined the actual story to portray the film over the course of 19 minutes. The film was released on 3 August 1903 at the Huber's Fourteenth Street Museum in New-York.

== Plot ==
The movie consists of 14 sequences:

1. Eliza Pleads with Tom to Run Away
Snowy landscape at night. A typical Southern log cabin. Snowing. Uncle Tom's home at Shelby's plantation. Eliza Harris hastily appears with her little boy and taps on the cabin window. Eliza informs him of the sale of himself and her boy to the slave traders, and tells him that she has decided to run away. She tries to induce Tom to accompany her but he Tom refuses.

2. Phineas Outwits the Slave Traders
A large room in a tavern by the river side. Phineas Fletcher, a plantation owner, enters, and looking out of the window, discovers that the river is full of floating ice. Eliza and her child, enter almost exhausted. Eliza inquires if there are any ferries running across the river that night but he says that they have stopped running. Marks enters followed by Haley who tells him that he has bought a little boy and his mother who have run away. He asks Phineas if he had seen anything of them. Phineas takes the trio to one side of the room, while Eliza escapes out of the window. When the slave traders turn around, Phineas holds them at bay with two large revolvers.

3. The Escape of Eliza
Wood scene by the river full of floating ice. Eliza appears with the slave traders with their dogs in hot pursuit. She jumps on a cake of floating ice just in time to escape the blood-hounds.

4. Reunion of Eliza and George Harris
Phineas helps Eliza reunite with her husband George Harris. But the slave traders find them and a fight ensues in which Haley is shot while Harris, his wife and child escape.

5. Steamboat Race Between the "Robert E. Lee" and "Natchez"
Two boats are coming down the Mississippi river at a very high speed. The "Robert E. Lee" is gradually drawing ahead. As the "Natchez" gets to the centre of the scene, a terrific explosion takes place.

6. The Rescue of Eva
A large number of slaves are seen dancing and shouting a welcome at the arrival of the "Robert E. Lee" at the dock and the passengers disembark. As Eva is pushed overboard by a crowd of passengers, Tom dives quickly to her rescue. A line is thrown from the dock and Tom and Eva are pulled to safety. St. Clare, Eva's father purchases Uncle Tom at Eva's request.

7. Welcome Home to St. Clare, Eva and Uncle Tom
The garden in front of St. Clare's home. A large number of slave are dancing joyously at the arrival of St. Clare, Uncle Tom and Eva. St. Clare tells his wife of the rescue of Eva by Uncle Tom. Topsy appears and goes through a very funny dance.

8. Eva and Tom in the Garden
Same setting as Scene 7 at night. Tom and Eva enter and sit on the rustic bench under a tree. Eva becomes ill. Her father takes her inside.

9. Death of Eva
Eva's bed chamber. She lies sick on a couch with St. Clare and Aunt Ophelia by her side. Mrs. St. Clare enters and St. Clare tells her that Eva is dying. Eva points toward the sky, telling her father that she is going there, and falls back dead. An angel appears, takes her spirit and ascends.

10. St. Clare Defends Uncle Tom
A bar room. Marks enters with a friend and sits at a table. St. Clare, who has been drinking heavily since the death of Eva, enters, followed by Uncle Tom. Simon Legree, owner of a large plantation invites all hands to have a drink. St. Clare says he does not drink with strangers which makes Legree furious. After drinking, he offers a drink to Uncle Tom, who refuses it. This increases Legree's anger and he throws the contents of the glass in Uncle Tom's face. St. Clare knocks him down. Legree draws a large knife from his belt and plunges it into St. Clare's heart.

11. The Auction of St. Clare's Slaves
A dock scene with bar room and warehouses on one side, and a large number of steam boats moored to the wharf. The auctioneer proceeds to open the sale. Emaline, a beautiful mulatto girl, and Tom are sold to Legree.

12. Tom Refuses to Flog Emaline
A large cotton-field at Legree's plantation with slaves picking cotton in the foreground. Uncle Tom is trying to keep up with the younger slaves, but is unable to do so. Cassy, a former mistress of Legree, gives Uncle Tom a hand when the overseer's back is turned. Legree tells Emaline that he has decided to take her out of the fields and tells her to go to the house. She declines to do so, which enrages Legree. He tells Tom to take his whip and flog Emaline. He throws the whip to the ground, refusing to whip her. Legree has Tom tied to the whipping post and whips him until he is stopped by Cassy.

13. Marks Avenges the Death of St. Clare and Uncle Tom
Legree's home with a large veranda framed by great colonial pillars and cotton fields in the background. Legree has Tom brought to him and asks if he knows the hiding place of Emaline and Cassy, who ran away the night before. Tom refuses to reveal it. Legree becomes furious and strikes Tom over the head and has him sent to die in his shed. Marks enters and informs Legree that he has a warrant for his arrest for the murder of St. Clare. Legree tries to strike him with his whip but Marks dodges and shoots him dead.

14. Death of Uncle Tom
Uncle Tom is lying on the floor of an old woodshed. George Shelby enters and tells him that he has come to take him back home. Tom tells him that he is dying and pointing to the sky, says that he can see his Heavenly home; a vision of Eva in Heaven appears as Tom drops back dead. Shelby kneels by his side, as a series of visions appear: John Brown being led to execution, a battle scene from the Civil War, and Abraham Lincoln with a slave kneeling at his feet with broken manacles.

== Production and release ==
Uncle Tom's Cabin was one of the earliest "full-length" American movies, although in 1903 this meant about 19 minutes. Porter shot the film at the Edison Company's studio in New York. Rather than an adaptation of the novel, the movie's actors, sets, costumes and much of its staging derive from one of the turn-of-the-century theatrical Tom Shows which were very popular at the time. Each of the fourteen scenes is based on a theatre-like stage with its own set, with the exception of scenes 7 and 8 which use the same set, and scene 5 where models are filmed. This was the first American film to include intertitles to identify and introduce each scene.

The film premiered on 3 August 1903 at Huber's Fourteenth Street Museum, sharing the program with several live acts, including a pair of "colored comedians".

On 12 September, Sigmund Lubin released a slightly shorter version of Uncle Tom's Cabin which was "remarkably similar" to Porter's version, a practice which was quite common in the early days of cinema when copyright protection of films was not well established.

== Analysis ==
Compared to Porter's film that many historians regard as his masterwork, The Great Train Robbery, Uncle Tom's Cabin has been regarded as quite primitive. John W. Frick notes that it has been characterised by film historians as old fashioned for it was little more than filmed theatre. This is warranted by the fact that the entire film was shot from a single stationary camera and that the sets were the painted scenery of 19th century theatre, while the performers, sets, and costumes were those from an existing Tom troupe.

Stephen Railton, noting that Porter had incorporated several unmotivated breakdowns with slaves dancing and "cavorting happily", regretted that "like the Tom Shows after the Reconstruction era, the 1903 film almost entirely transformed Stowe's act of protest into a minstrel show". It should not be understated however that the film present female slaves as strong characters refusing slavery and Uncle Tom as a kind of Christian martyr. Deborah Barker and Kathryn McKee remark that Porter's film "reimagines the story's antebellum narrative in the context of the Civil War and its aftermath." The final scene, the death of Tom, contains a series of "visions" evoking events related to the abolition of slavery: John Brown being led to execution, a battle scene from the Civil War, Abraham Lincoln with a slave with broken manacles kneeling at his feet, and Generals Lee and Grant shaking hands at Appomattox.

Charles Musser stressed that the film inaugurated one important innovation, inspired by British director G.A. Smith: "Each scene was prefaced by a title on film which helped the audience follow the story by identifying the scene and some of the principal characters". He also noted that the fifth scene could be seen as modern in its concept if not in its execution. "Employing miniatures moving in front of a backdrop representing a rural village, his boat race featured a violent thunderstorm created by dramatic lighting effects." The use of double exposure in the scenes of Eva's death and Tom's death, also distinguish the film from pure filmed theatre.

Stephen Johnson noted that the film represents "an early effort to translate live performance in something cinematic, (...) a rare example of the filming of what was an improvisatory, oral-performative culture, (...) a rare instance of white performers, white performers in blackface, and performers of colour (...) sharing the screen." Despite its short duration, the film is very comprehensive, and "when the film is slowed down to play at half or a quarter of its intended speed, it is possible to follow a full length stage script with a reasonable correspondence."

== See also ==
- Edwin S. Porter filmography
