= Life of a Cowboy =

Life of a Cowboy (1906)
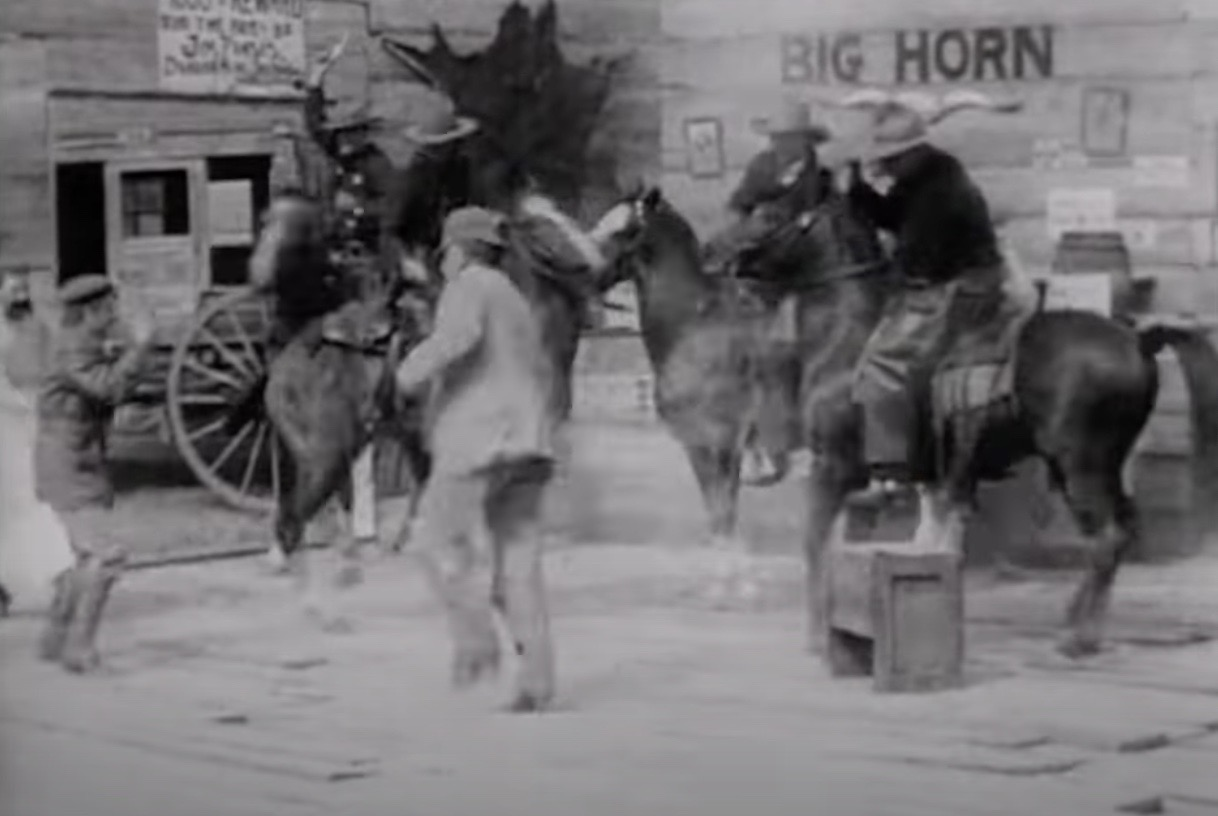
- Bad guys making an Englishman "dance" by shooting at his feet
- Directed by: Edwin S. Porter
- Cinematography: Edwin S. Porter
- Distributed by: Edison Manufacturing Company
- Release date: June 1906
- Running time: 17 minutes
- Country: United States
- Languages: Silent film with English intertitles

Life of a Cowboy is a 1906 American short silent Western film produced by Edison Manufacturing Company and directed by Edwin S. Porter.

== Plot ==
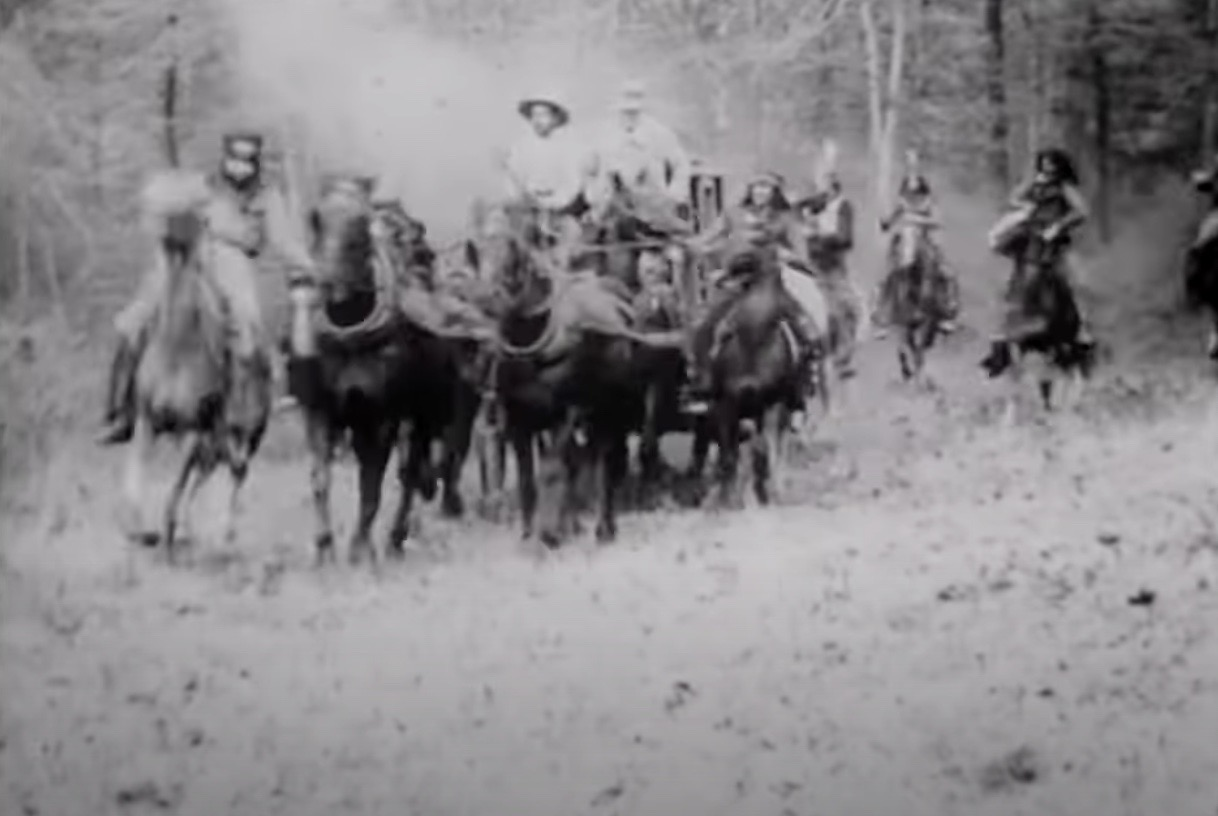
Outlaws attacking a stagecoach

The film opens in a saloon called the "Big Horn". An old Indian staggers in but the bartender refuses to serve him. A "bad guy" walks in and orders a drink, and tries to give it to the Indian, but an Indian girl knocks away the glass. The bad guy threatens her but the "good guy" steps in to protect her, then runs the bad guy out of the saloon.

Next, an Englishman and his friends come in for a drink. Some bad guy cowboys ride into the saloon on their horses and start firing their gun. Several fire at the feet of the Englishman to make him "dance" (a similar scene takes place in The Great Train Robbery). The next scene shows the Englishman and his friends coming out of a stagecoach; one of the friends is pushed to the ground and flogged with a saddle. Then there is a scene of a cowboy performing lasso tricks and playfully roping first the Englishman, then a woman on horseback.

The party, having finished their visit, re-enters the stagecoach and rides away. One of the bad guys sees them leave, then rounds up some Indians to chase the stagecoach. They catch up to the stagecoach and capture a pretty girl passenger. The stage driver escapes and goes to find the good guy. When the good guy finds out what happened, he rounds up a posse and goes off to save the girl. The posse gives chase to the Indians, killing several in the process, and the girl is rescued. The last scene shows the good guy and the girl sitting arm-in-arm. The bad guy sneaks up on him and tries to kill him, but the Indian girl from the first scene shoots the bad guy first, then kneels down at the feet of the good guy, in gratitude for saving her.

== Analysis ==
The film's duration is 17 minutes, which was long for the time. Porter considered it "the first Western". Today, The Great Train Robbery is widely accepted as the first Western, but at the time it was made, The Great Train Robbery (which Porter also directed) was considered a "crime film" rather than a Western.

Life of a Cowboy contains many Western "tropes" such as lassoing, chases on horseback, robbery of a stagecoach, kidnapping and rescuing of "the girl", shooting at the feet to make a person "dance", white hats for good guys and black hats for bad guys, and Indians as villains. The film suffers from a confusing plot line, exacerbated by the lack of intertitles.

== See also ==
- Edwin S. Porter filmography
