= Rube and Mandy at Coney Island =

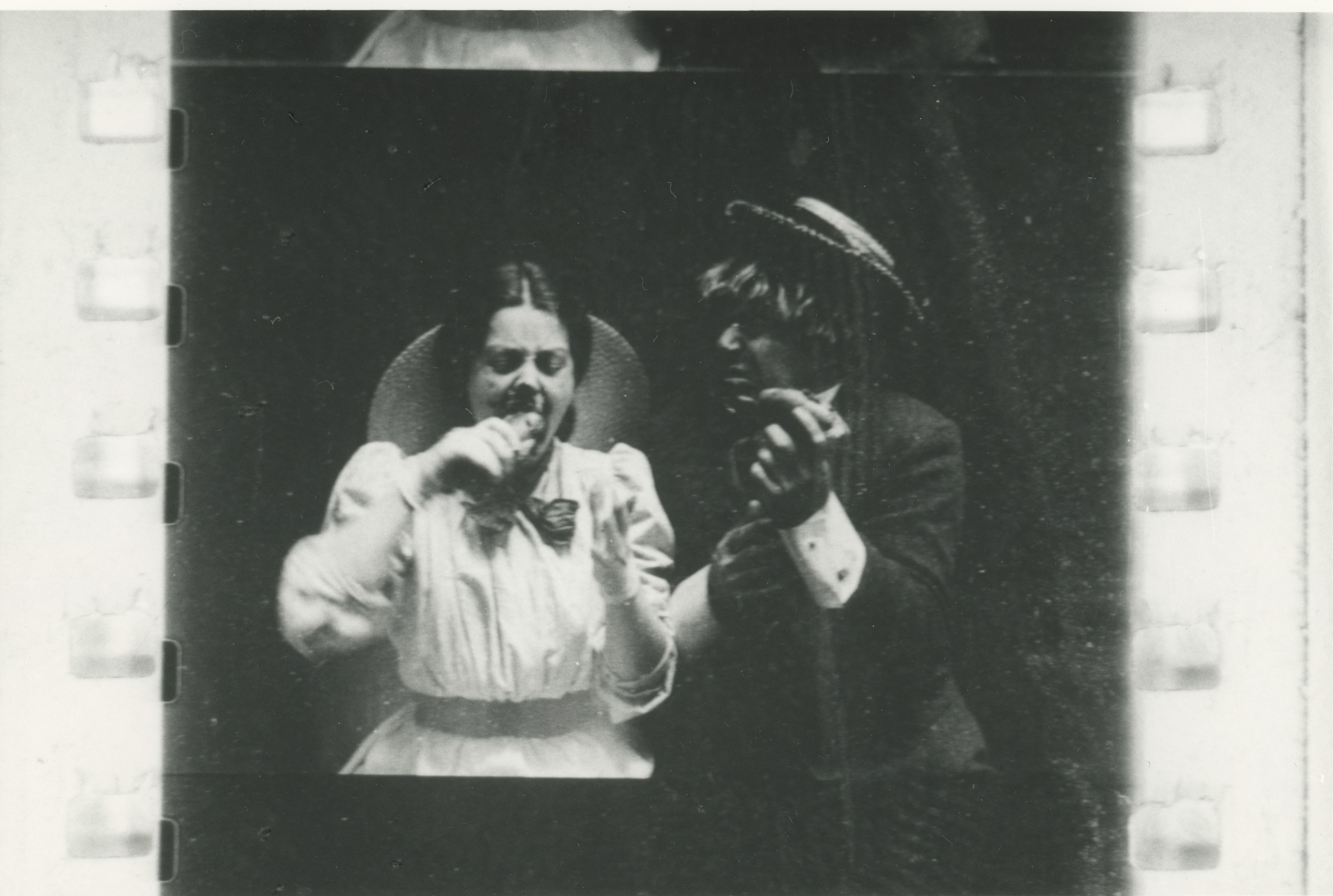
- The final close up: eating a hotdog
- Directed by: Edwin S. Porter
- Produced by: Edwin S. Porter
- Cinematography: Edwin S. Porter
- Edited by: Edwin S. Porter
- Distributed by: Edison Manufacturing Company
- Release date: August 15, 1903
- Running time: 10 minutes (at 20 frame/s)
- Country: United States
- Language: Silent

Rube and Mandy at Coney Island was produced, directed, shot and edited by Edwin S. Porter Copyrighted on August 13, 1903, the 725 ft., 35mm film lasted roughly 10 minutes if projected at 20 frames per second.

== Plot ==
Rube and Mandy at Coney Island (1903)

The picture was subsequently described in an Edison catalog:

The first scene shows a country couple entering Steeplechase Park. They proceed to amuse themselves on the steeplechase, rope bridge, the "Down and Out" and riding the bulls. The scene then changes to a panorama of Luna Park, showing Rube and Mandy doing stunts on the rattan slide, riding on the miniature railway, shooting the chutes, riding the boats in the old mill, and visiting Professor Wormwood's Monkey theatre. They next appear on the Bowery, visiting the fortune tellers, striking the punching machine and winding up with the frankfurter man. The climax shows a bust view of Rube and Mandy eating frankfurters. Interesting for the humorous features, and the excellent views of Coney Island and Luna Park.

== Release and reception ==
The film itself was quickly advertised in the New York Clipper and was soon appearing in vaudeville theaters throughout the country as the headline attraction in their film program. In some instances, Rube and Mandy at Coney Island was on the opening bills for the 1903-04 theatrical season. This was a pivotal moment for cinema in many respects, including the shift to longer story films of which this is a somewhat tentative example. Moreover, as the new theatrical season began, exhibition services had added the three-blade shutter to their projectors, which reduced flicker and increased viewing pleasure.

To some extent, the film's reception benefited from this innovation; in any case, many newspapers hailed it as a wild success. The Jacques Theater in Waterbury, Ct, began its new season with the film on its vaudeville bill. The local theater reviewer observed that: “Unlimited praise might be given every act on the bill, but the electrotype pictures of Rube and Mandy at Coney Island have been so much talked about that it probably monopolizes the chief attention. It is enough to say of it that anyone who misses seeing it will miss something that is as laugh-producing as anything that can be imagined.” The film garnered additional kudos when shown the following week at Poli's in New Haven: “The children do enjoy the journey of Mandy and Reuben to Coney Island as shown in the electrograph. It's worth bringing them to see. It was a hit last night even with the grown-ups.” The electrograph service showed it the following week at Poli's Hartford Theater where it “aroused so much hilarity.”

The film continued to be shown by traveling showmen for the next few years––and continued to be screened into the nickelodeon era.

== In popular culture ==
Rube [short for Reuben] and Mandy were stock characters in American popular culture. Along with Uncle Josh, they were country folk with little or no knowledge of city ways. In short, they were “hicks” whose encounters with city living were often a source of comedy. They show up, if only very occasionally, in early newspapers, going back to the 1880s and continued into the first decade of the twentieth century. This was a transitional moment in terms of head titles. The film lacks a head title, which was doubtlessly supplied by the exhibitor using a lantern slide.

== See also ==
- Edwin S. Porter filmography
