= Jack and the Beanstalk (1902 film) =

1902 film

- Directed by: Edwin S. Porter
- Produced by: Edison Studios
- Starring: See below
- Cinematography: Edwin S. Porter
- Release date: July 15, 1902
- Running time: 10 minutes
- Country: United States
- Language: English

Jack and the Beanstalk is a 1902 American silent trick film directed by Edwin S. Porter. With ten sequential shots, Jack and the Beanstalk was twice as long as any previous studio film. According to Porter, "It took in the neighborhood of six weeks in the spring of 1902 to successfully make this photograph."

== Plot summary ==
Jack and the Beanstalk (1902)

In this earliest known filmed adaptation of the classic fairy tale, Jack first trades his cow for the bean. His mother then makes him drop them in the front yard, and go to his room. As he sleeps, Jack is visited by a fairy who shows him glimpses of what will await him when he ascends the bean stalk. In this version, Jack is the son of a deposed king.

When Jack wakes up, he finds the beanstalk has grown and he climbs to the top where he enters the giant's home. The giant finds Jack, who narrowly escapes. The giant chases Jack down the bean stalk, but Jack is able to cut it down before the giant can get to safety. He falls and is killed. Jack celebrates. The fairy then reveals that Jack may return home as a prince.

== Cast ==
Actors	Characters
James H. White	Farmer
Thomas White	Jack
Elsie Ferguson	Fairy

== Reception ==
In The First Twenty Years: A Segment of Film History, Kemp Niver notes that "the sets were extremely impressive, for they showed considerable ingenuity in their design... Throughout the film, Porter used the possibilities of a moving picture camera in a new way through the spectacular use of dissolves between scenes, stop camera action to allow people to appear and disappear, and the use of lantern slides as a projector of thought within a moving picture production."

Similarly, Charles Musser wrote that the film "contains all the elements that historian A. Nicholas Vardac sees in Life of an American Fireman: the pictorial development of two lines of action, spectacular devices such as the vision that introduces the second line of action, dissolves between scenes, and a change in camera position showing interior and exterior as the action moves from one space to the next."
