= Edison Studios =

Defunct American film production organization (1894–1918)

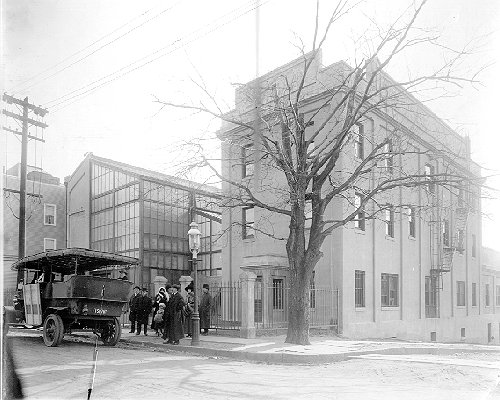
- Edison Motion Picture Studio, in the Bronx, New York City, c. 1907–1918
- Industry: Motion pictures
- Founded: 1894; 132 years ago
- Founder: Thomas A. Edison
- Defunct: 1918; 108 years ago
- Headquarters: United States
- Number of locations: West Orange, New Jersey (1894–1901); Manhattan, New York City, New York (1901–1907); Bronx, New York City, New York (1907–1918)
- Area served: United States, Europe
- Key people: William Gilmore (Vice President and General Manager); William Kennedy Dickson (Producer); William Heise (Producer); James H. White (Producer); William Markgraf (Producer); Alex T. Moore (Producer); Horace G. Plimpton (Producer); Edwin S. Porter (Director); John Hancock Collins (Director); Richard Ridgely (Director); Ben Turbett (Director); J. Searle Dawley (Director); Oscar Apfel (Director); Harold M. Shaw (Director); Charles Brabin (Director); Alan Crosland (Director); Edward H. Griffith (Director); Ned van Buren (Cinematographer); John Arnold (cinematographer); Philip Tannura (Cinematographer)
- Products: Silent films
- Parent: Edison Manufacturing Company (1894–1911); Thomas A. Edison, Inc. (1911–1918)

Edison Studios was an American film production organization, owned by companies controlled by inventor and entrepreneur, Thomas Edison. The studio made close to 1,200 films, as part of the Edison Manufacturing Company (1894–1911) and then Thomas A. Edison, Inc. (1911–1918), until the studio's closing in 1918. Of that number, 54 were feature length, and the remainder were shorts. All of the company's films have fallen into the public domain because they were released before 1931.

== History ==
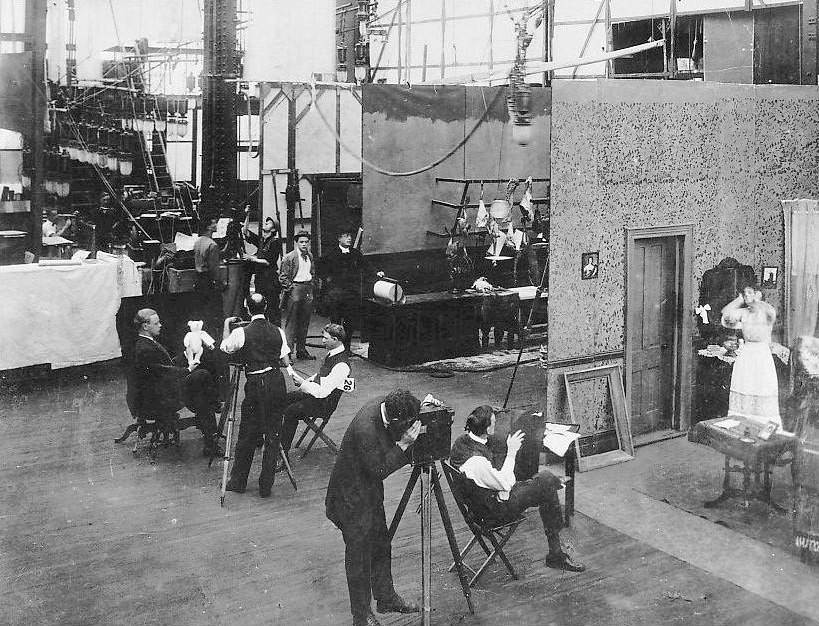
Several films in production at Edison's Bronx studio, c. 1912. Seated in the foreground, with his legs crossed, is Charles Brabin; seated to the rear, with the card "26" under his arm, is Harold M. Shaw.

The first production facility was Edison's Black Maria studio, in West Orange, New Jersey, built in the winter of 1892–93. The second facility, a glass-enclosed rooftop studio built at 41 East 21st Street in Manhattan's entertainment district, opened in 1901. In 1907, Edison had new facilities built, on Decatur Avenue and Oliver Place, in the Bedford Park neighborhood of the Bronx.

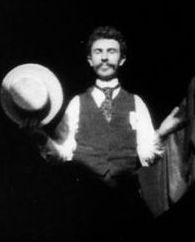
William Kennedy Dickson, an early motion picture innovator, film production inventor, and assistant of Thomas A. Edison, eventually left to form the Biograph Company.

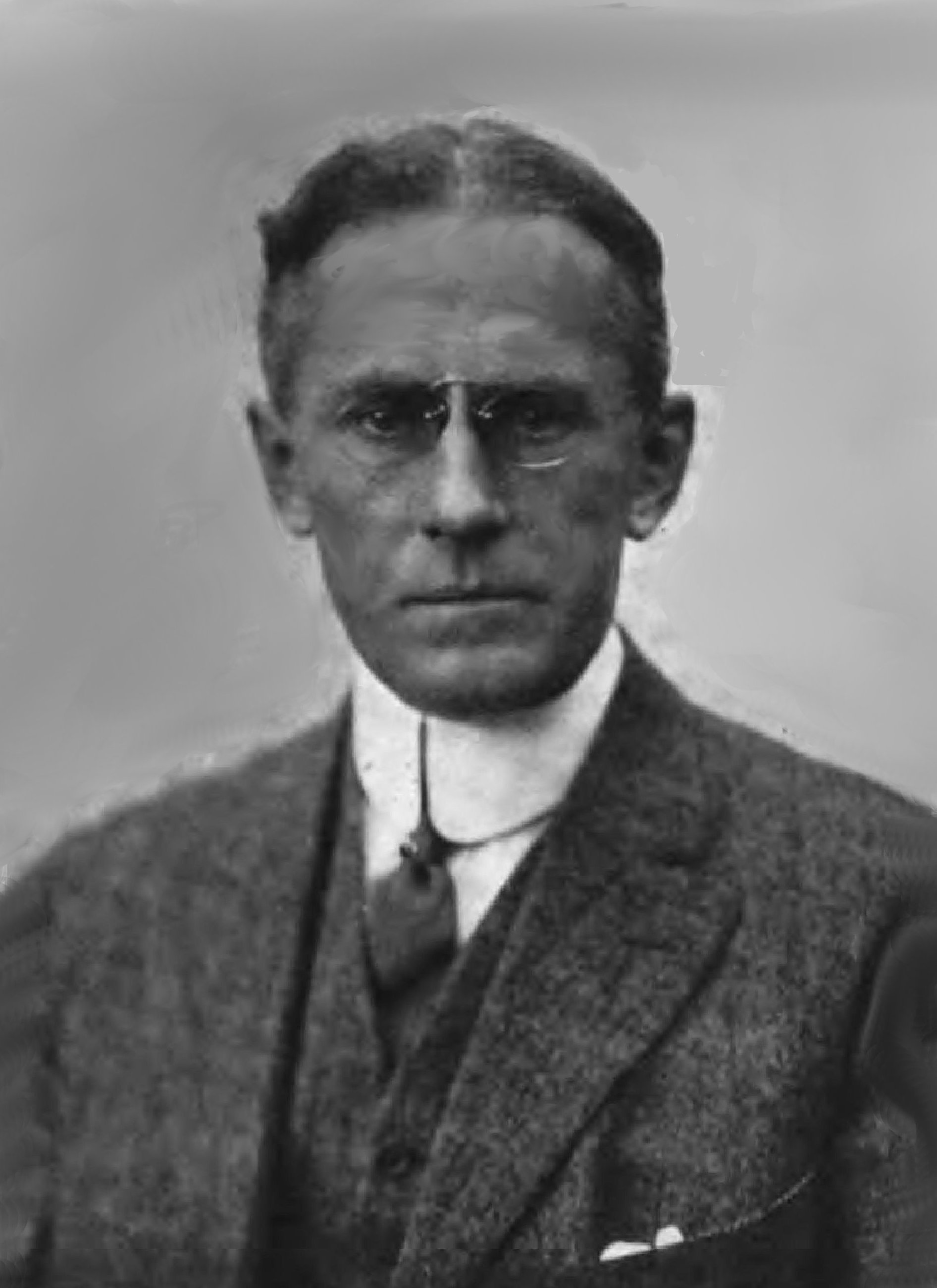
Horace G. Plimpton, an Edison Studios film producer 1909–1915

Thomas Edison himself played no direct part in the making of his studios' films, beyond being the owner and appointing William Gilmore as vice-president and general manager. Edison's assistant William Kennedy Dickson, who supervised the development of Edison's motion picture system, produced the first Edison films intended for public exhibition, 1893–95. After Dickson's departure for the American Mutoscope and Biograph Company in 1895, he was replaced as director of production by cameraman William Heise, then from 1896 to 1903, by James H. White. When White left to supervise Edison's European interests in 1903, he was replaced by William Markgraf (1903–1904), then Alex T. Moore (1904–1909), and Horace G. Plimpton (1909–1915).

The first commercially exhibited motion pictures in the United States were from Edison, and premiered at a Kinetoscope parlor in New York City on April 14, 1894. The program consisted of ten short films, each less than a minute long, of athletes, dancers, and other performers. After competitors began exhibiting films on screens, Edison introduced its own, Projecting Kinetoscope, in late 1896.

The earliest productions were brief "actualities", showing everything, from acrobats, to parades, to fire calls. But, competition from French and British story films, in the early 1900s, rapidly changed the market. By 1904, 85% of Edison's sales were from story films.

In December 1908, Edison led the formation of the Motion Picture Patents Company in an attempt to control the industry and shut out smaller producers. The "Edison Trust", as it was nicknamed, was made up of Edison, Biograph, Essanay Studios, Kalem Company, George Kleine Productions, Lubin Studios, Georges Méliès, Pathé, Selig Studios, and Vitagraph Studios, and dominated distribution through the General Film Company. The Motion Picture Patents Co. and the General Film Co. were found guilty of antitrust violation in October 1915, and were dissolved.

The breakup of the Trust by federal courts, under monopoly laws, and the loss of European markets during World War I, hurt Edison financially. Edison sold its film business, including the Bronx studio, on 30 March 1918, to the Lincoln & Parker Film Company, of Massachusetts.

== Notable productions ==
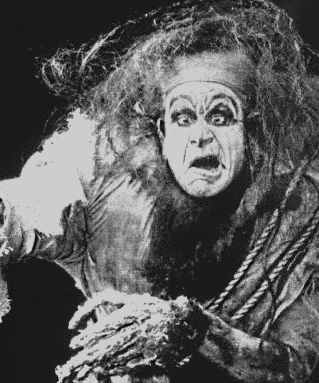
Edison Studios produced the first motion picture adaptation of Mary Shelley's Frankenstein (1910).

Some of the studio's notable productions include The Kiss (1896); The Great Train Robbery (1903); Alice's Adventures in Wonderland (1910); Frankenstein (1910), the first film adaptation of the novel; The Battle of Trafalgar (1911); What Happened to Mary (1912), one of the earliest film serials; and The Land Beyond the Sunset (1912), which was directed by Harold M. Shaw and was later described by film historian William K. Everson as "'the screen's first genuinely lyrical film'". The company produced Execution of Czolgosz with Panorama of Auburn Prison, a reenactment of the execution of Leon Czolgosz, after it was denied permission to film the actual execution in 1901. It produced historical reenactments of The Execution of Mary, Queen of Scots and The Execution of Joan of Arc in 1895 and filmed Electrocuting an Elephant in 1903. The company also produced a number of short "Kinetophone" sound films in 1913–1914 using a sophisticated acoustical recording system capable of picking up sound from 30 feet away. They released a number of Raoul Barré cartoon films in 1915 and the first film version of the Robert Louis Stevenson historical novel Kidnapped.

== Legacy ==
Everson, calling Edison Studios "financially successful and artistically unambitious," wrote that other than directors Edwin S. Porter and John Hancock Collins,

[T]he Edison studios never turned out a notable director, or even one above average. Nor did the Edison films show the sense of dynamic progress, that one gets, from studying the Biograph films, on a year-by-year basis. On the contrary, there is a sense of stagnation.

However, new restorations and screenings of Edison films in recent years contradict Everson's statement; indeed, Everson citing The Land Beyond the Sunset points out creativity at Edison beyond Porter and Collins, as it was directed by Harold M. Shaw (1877–1926), who later went on to a successful career directing in England, South Africa, and Lithuania before returning to the US in 1922. Other important directors who started at Edison included Oscar Apfel, Charles Brabin, Alan Crosland, J. Searle Dawley, and Edward H. Griffith.

== Notable films ==
Blacksmith Scene (1893)

Fred Ott's Sneeze (1894)

Annie Oakley shooting glass balls, 1894

Leonard-Cushing fight (1894), the first boxing match on film.

The Kiss (1896), the first love scene on film.

What Happened on Twenty-third Street in New York City (1901)

The Great Train Robbery (1903), the first "Western" ever filmed.

The Messenger Boys Mistake (1903)

Nervy Nat Kisses the Bride (1904)

Battle of Chemulpo Bay (1904), a re-enactment of the Battle of Chemulpo Bay.

The Night Before Christmas (1905), an early film adaptation of the 1823 poem, "A Visit from St. Nicholas".

The climax of Frankenstein (1910), the first film adaptation of the 1818 novel Frankenstein.

== See also ==
- it:Filmografia della Edison Edison Studios Filmography
