= Edwin S. Porter =

American film pioneer (1870–1941)

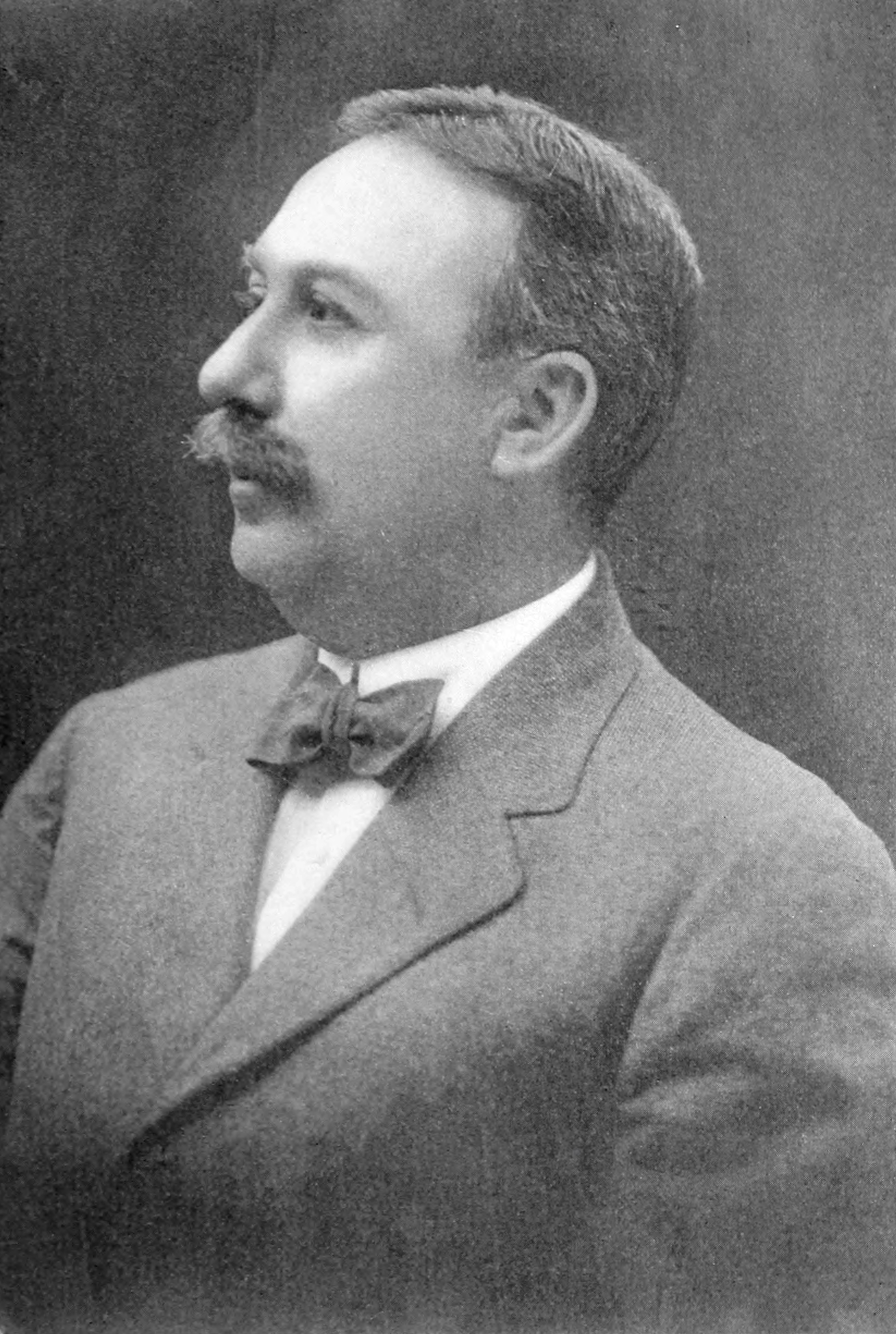
- Porter, 1912
- Born: Edwin Stanton Porter; April 21, 1870; Connellsville, Pennsylvania, U.S.
- Died: April 30, 1941 (aged 71); New York City, U.S.
- Resting place: Husband Cemetery, Somerset, Pennsylvania
- Occupations: Film director; film producer; studio manager; cinematographer

Edwin Stanton Porter (April 21, 1870 – April 30, 1941) was an American film pioneer, most famous as a producer, director, studio manager and cinematographer with the Edison Manufacturing Company and the Famous Players Film Company. Of over 250 films created by Porter, his most important include What Happened on Twenty-third Street, New York City (1901), Jack and the Beanstalk (1902), Life of an American Fireman (1903), The Great Train Robbery (1903), The European Rest Cure (1904), The Kleptomaniac (1905), Life of a Cowboy (1906), Rescued from an Eagle's Nest (1908), The Prisoner of Zenda (1913), and Tess of the Storm Country (1914).

== Birth and education ==
Porter was born and raised in Connellsville, Pennsylvania, to Thomas Richard Porter, a merchant, and Mary (Clark) Porter; he was the fourth of seven children with four brothers (Chales W., Frank, John, and Everett Melbourne) and two sisters (Mary and Ada). Named Edward at birth, he later changed his name to Edwin Stanton, after Edwin Stanton, the Democratic politician from Ohio who had served as Abraham Lincoln's Secretary of War. After attending public schools in Connellsville, Porter worked, among other odd jobs, as an exhibition skater, a sign painter, and a telegraph operator. He developed an interest in electricity at a young age, and shared a patent at age 21 for a lamp regulator. Eventually becoming a merchant tailor, Porter was battered by the Panic of 1893. He filed for bankruptcy on June 15 and enlisted in the United States Navy four days later on June 19. He served three years as a gunner's mate, serving on the USS New York (ACR-2) and at the Brooklyn Navy Yard.

== Career ==
=== Early career ===
He was employed initially in the electrical department of William Cramp & Sons, a Philadelphia ship and engine building company. During his three years' service he showed aptitude as an inventor of electrical devices to improve communications.

Porter entered motion picture work in 1896, the first year movies were commercially projected on large screens in the United States. He was briefly employed in New York City by Raff & Gammon, agents for the films and viewing equipment made by Thomas Edison, and then left to become a touring projectionist with a competing machine, Kuhn & Webster's Projectorscope. He traveled through the West Indies and South America, showing films at fairgrounds and in open fields. He later made a second tour through Canada and the United States.

Returning to New York City in early 1898, Porter found work at the Eden Musée, a Manhattan wax museum and amusement hall which had become a center for motion picture exhibition and production and licensee of the Edison Manufacturing Company. While at Eden Musée, Porter worked assembling programs of Edison films, most particularly exhibitions of films of the Spanish–American War, Edison productions which helped stir an outbreak of patriotic fever in New York City. As an exhibitor, Porter had tremendous creative control over these programs, presenting a slate of films accompanied by a selection of music and live narration.

=== Edison ===
Porter joined the Edison Manufacturing Company in November 1900. Soon afterward he took charge of motion picture production at Edison's New York studios, operating the camera, directing the actors, and assembling the final print. He collaborated with several other filmmakers, including George S. Fleming. During the next decade Porter became the most influential filmmaker in the United States. From his experience as a touring projectionist, Porter knew what pleased crowds, and he began by making trick films and comedies for Edison. One of his early films was Terrible Teddy, the Grizzly King, a satire made in February 1901 about the then Vice President-elect, Theodore Roosevelt. Like all early filmmakers, he took ideas from others, but rather than simply copying films he tried to improve on what he borrowed. In his Jack and the Beanstalk (1902) and Life of an American Fireman (1903) he followed earlier films by France's Georges Méliès and members of England's Brighton School, such as James Williamson. Instead of using abrupt splices or cuts between shots, however, Porter created dissolves, gradual transitions from one image to another. In Life of an American Fireman particularly, the technique helped audiences follow complex outdoor movement. Uncle Tom's Cabin was the first American film to use intertitles which helped the audience follow the story by identifying the scenes and some of the principal characters.

=== The Great Train Robbery and after ===
Porter's next film, The Great Train Robbery (1903) took the archetypal American Western story, already familiar to audiences from dime novels and stage melodrama, and made it an entirely new visual experience. The one-reel film, with a running time of twelve minutes, was assembled in twenty separate shots, along with a startling close-up of a bandit firing at the camera. It used as many as ten different indoor and outdoor locations and was groundbreaking in its use of "cross-cutting" in film editing to show simultaneous action in different places. No earlier film had created such swift movement or variety of scene. The Great Train Robbery was enormously popular. For several years it toured throughout the United States, and in 1905 it was the premier attraction at the first nickelodeon. Its success firmly established motion pictures as commercial entertainment in the United States.

PLAY Nervy Nat Kisses the Bride (1904) directed by Porter; partial copy (duration 2:01)

After The Great Train Robbery Porter continued to try out new techniques. He presented two parallel stories in The Kleptomaniac (1905), a film of social commentary like his technically more conventional film of 1904, The Ex-Convict. In The Seven Ages (1905) he used side lighting, close-ups, and changed shots within a scene, one of the earliest examples of a filmmaker departing from the theatrical analogy of a single shot for each scene. He also directed trick films such as Dream of a Rarebit Fiend (1906), based on the comic strip by Winsor McCay. Between 1903 and 1907 he successfully demonstrated most of the techniques that were to become the basic modes of visual communication through film. For instance, he helped to develop the modern concept of continuity editing, notably in The Trainer's Daughter; or, A Race for Love (1907), and is often credited with discovering that the basic unit of structure in film was the "shot" rather than the scene (the basic unit on the stage), paving the way for D. W. Griffith's advances in editing and screen storytelling. Yet he seemed to regard them only as separate experiments and never brought them together in a unified filmmaking style. Porter directed future filmmaker Griffith in Rescued from an Eagle's Nest (1908).

=== Defender and Rex Film Companies ===
PLAY Lighthouse by the Sea (1911) directed by Porter for Edison Studios, full tinted copy (duration: 14:46)

In 1909 after tiring of the industrial system set up to feed the booming nickelodeon business, Porter left Edison and founded a company to manufacture Simplex motion picture projectors. In 1910 he founded Defender Film Company, which folded after one year. In 1911 he joined with others in organizing the Rex Motion Picture Company. In 1912 he sold out and accepted an offer from Adolph Zukor to become chief director of the new Famous Players Film Company, the first American company that regularly produced feature-length films. He directed stage actor James K. Hackett in their first feature film, The Prisoner of Zenda (1913). He also directed Mary Pickford in her first feature film, A Good Little Devil (1913), also directing Pauline Frederick and John Barrymore.

=== 3D movie pioneer ===
But his directorial skills had not kept pace with rapid changes in motion picture art, although his technical skills were piqued by 3D. Porter's last film premiered on June 10, 1915, Niagara Falls, the first anaglyph 3D movie. In 1916 he left Famous Players during a reorganization.

=== Precision Machine Company ===
From 1917 to 1925 Porter served as president of the Precision Machine Company, manufacturers of the Simplex projectors. After his retirement in 1925 he continued to work on his own as an inventor and designer, securing several patents for still cameras and projector devices. During the 1930s he was employed by an appliance corporation.

== Death ==
External videos
- Edwin Stanton Porter House, Somerset PA, (5:04) by Berkeley Chapman, May 23, 2011

Aged 71, he died in 1941 at the Hotel Taft in New York City and was buried in Husband Cemetery, Somerset, Pennsylvania. He was survived by his wife, Caroline Ridinger, whom he had married on June 5, 1893; they had no children.

== Legacy ==
Porter remains an enigmatic figure in motion picture history. Though his significance as director of The Great Train Robbery and other innovative early films is undeniable, he rarely repeated an innovation after he had used it successfully, never developed a consistent directorial style, and in later years never protested when others rediscovered his techniques and claimed them as their own. He was a modest, quiet, cautious man who felt uncomfortable working with the famous stars he directed starting in 1912. Zukor said of Porter that he was more an artistic mechanic than a dramatic artist, a man who liked to deal with machines better than with people.

== See also ==
- Edwin S. Porter filmography
