= Edison Manufacturing Company =

Company organized in 1889 by Thomas Edison

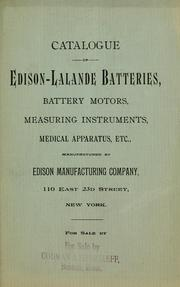
- Catalogue of Edison-Lalande batteries etc. 1910
- Founded: 1889
- Founder: Thomas Edison
- Defunct: 1926
- Successor: Thomas A. Edison, Inc.
- Headquarters: New York City, U.S.

The Edison Manufacturing Company, originally registered as under the name of the United Edison Manufacturing Company and often known as simply the Edison Company, was organized by scientist / inventor and entrepreneur, Thomas A. Edison (1847–1931), and incorporated in New York City in May 1889. It succeeded the earlier Edison United Manufacturing Company, founded in 1886 as a sales agency for the old Edison Lamp Company (forerunner of the modern General Electric Company), Edison Machine Works, and Bergmann & Company, which made electric lighting fixtures, bulbs, sockets, and other accessories. In April 1894, the Edison laboratory's new invention of the Kinetoscope motion pictures / filming process and cameras operation, which was about to be commercialized, was brought under the Edison Company umbrella. Six years later in 1900, the United Edison Manufacturing Company was evidently succeeded by the New Jersey–incorporated of the reorganized Edison Manufacturing Company. The company's assets and operations were transferred to his personal estate / corporation of Thomas A. Edison, Inc. a decade later in 1911.

== History ==
The Edison United Manufacturing Company was incorporated in July 1886 to consolidate the sales operations of the various Edison manufacturing concerns. The company went into liquidation—finalized October 31, 1889—and was succeeded by the United Edison Manufacturing Company, incorporated in New York City under New York law in May 1889. On May 4, 1900, the Edison Manufacturing Company—evidently the successor to the previous United Edison Manufacturing Company—was incorporated in Newark, New Jersey (under New Jersey state law), with its headquarters located in West Orange, New Jersey, the geographic site of the Edison laboratories and shops.

From April 1894 to June 1908, William E. Gilmore was vice-president and general manager of the Edison Manufacturing Company. He took over from Alfred O. Tate and was succeeded by patent lawyer Frank Dyer. Edison's films were made by the Kinetograph Department of the Edison Manufacturing Company.

Edison's first moviemaking studio—and also the world's first—was the "Black Maria" in West Orange, New Jersey, where production of Kinetoscope films began in early 1893. The Edison Studios productions moved to a Manhattan facility in New York City after the turn of the 20th century, and a few years later to a studio further north in the then rural countryside of the borough of The Bronx. Filming locations around the United States and abroad / overseas were also used.

The company had the same senior executives as the more profitable but older and separate National Phonograph Company (established 1896, reorganized 1911, dissolved 1957), to which Edison paid more attention. Edison was also distracted by other enterprises including storage electric batteries, iron ore and cement, which competed for his financial resources and led to occasional loss of focus and setting of priorities.

In February 1911 the Edison Company's assets were assigned to the personal estate and corporation of Thomas A. Edison, Inc., and The Edison Manufacturing Company was formally dissolved on 9 November 1926, five years before Edison's death.

== Gallery ==
Silent movie with tinting Lighthouse by the Sea (1911) directed by Edwin S. Porter for Edison Manufacturing Company. Running time: 14:46.

Silent movie with Lord and the Peasant (1912) directed by J. Searle Dawley for Edison Manufacturing Company. Running time: 8:52

Silent comedy movie Mr. Toots' Tooth (1913) directed by Charles M. Seay for Edison Manufacturing Company. Running time: 06:35. Mr. Toots miraculously loses his tooth.
