= Frank Scaturro =

American lawyer, historian, public advocate, and politician

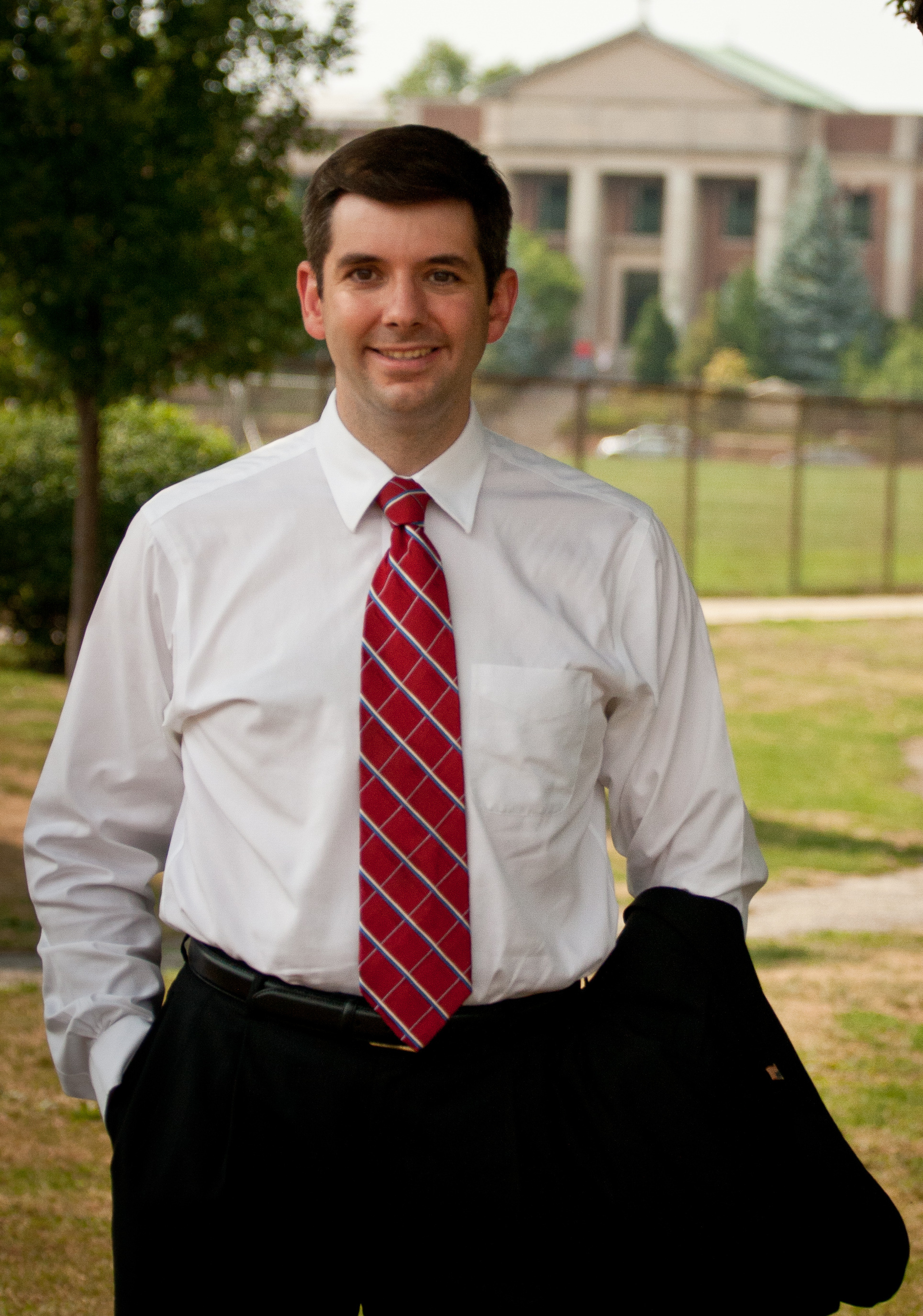

Personal details
- Born: Francis Joseph Scaturro; July 26, 1972 (age 54) New York City, U.S.
- Party: Republican
- Other political affiliations: Conservative Party of New York State
- Education: Columbia University, magna cum laude University of Pennsylvania School of Law
- Occupation: Attorney

Francis Joseph "Frank" Scaturro (born July 26, 1972) is an American lawyer, historian, public advocate, and politician. As a college student, he spearheaded the restoration of Grant's Tomb in New York City's Riverside Park, and in 1998 he published a reassessment of Ulysses S. Grant's presidency. Scaturro is a constitutional law expert and served as counsel for the Constitution on the U.S. Senate Judiciary Committee from 2005 to 2009, and helped coordinate the nomination process to elevate John Roberts and Samuel Alito to the United States Supreme Court. Scaturro published other books and articles about history, constitutional law, and public policy. He ran for Congress in 2010, 2012 and 2014 in New York's 4th congressional district on Long Island, but was defeated each time. Scaturro has been the president of the Grant Monument Association since 2009.

== Childhood ==
Scaturro was born in New York City in 1972. His family moved to New Hyde Park in Nassau County on Long Island the following year. His father, Salvatore, emigrated from Italy as a boy and was self-employed in a small business fixing air conditioning and refrigeration systems. His mother, Rosanne, worked near home as a legal secretary. Scaturro attended Notre Dame Elementary School in New Hyde Park and graduated with the school's highest honor. He then attended Chaminade High School in Mineola where he graduated near the top of his class. He was active in scouting and attained the rank of Eagle Scout.

== Education ==
Scaturro attended Columbia University and graduated Phi Beta Kappa, magna cum laude, in 1994 with an A.B. in history and political science. He won Columbia's Albert Marion Elsberg Prize for achievement in modern history. He then attended University of Pennsylvania Law School, receiving his J.D. in 1997, winning the Fred G. Leebron Memorial Prize for the top paper in constitutional law. He was articles editor for the Journal of International Economic Law.

== Legal career ==
Scaturro worked several years at two large commercial law firms headquartered in New York City, Lane & Mittendorf LLP (now Windels Marx Lane & Mittendorf LLP) and later, Cadwalader, Wickersham & Taft LLP. In 2005, he became counsel for the Constitution on the staff of the Senate Judiciary Committee assisting the Committee Chairman, Sen. Arlen Specter (R- PA), Sen. Jeff Sessions (R-AL, Ranking Member), and other Republican members of the committee. Scaturro's work focused on constitutional aspects of legislation and judicial and executive nominations. Among these, he assisted committee Republicans on the nominations of John Roberts, Samuel Alito, and Sonia Sotomayor to the U.S. Supreme Court, and Michael Mukasey and Eric Holder to become U.S. Attorney General.

In 2010, Scaturro returned home to Long Island and became a visiting Assistant Professor at Hofstra Law School, where he taught courses on the legislative process and constitutional law. He is currently a partner at FisherBroyles LLP, where he handles civil rights and commercial litigation.

== Publications ==
Scaturro published several books and articles about history and law, including President Grant Reconsidered (1998) which triggered a broad scholarly reassessment of the Grant presidency; The Supreme Court's Retreat from Reconstruction (2000), an exploration of a key chapter in the history of civil rights; Public Companies (2002), a book he co-authored about making public companies responsible following recent corporate scandals; and Never Give In: Battling Cancer in the Senate (2010), which documented Sen. Arlen Specter's cancer treatment while he was still in office. In 2023, Scaturro co-edited Grant at 200. Scaturro is currently working on a book about the Alabama Claims dispute between the United States and Great Britain following the Civil War, and how the ensuing arbitration inspired international peacekeeping efforts in future generations.

== Saving Grant's Tomb ==
Civil War general and 18th U.S. President Ulysses S. Grant died in 1885 and was interred in New York City's Riverside Park. Grant's Tomb is the largest mausoleum in the Western Hemisphere and was once among the nation's most widely visited tourist attractions. By the 1990s, however, the site had fallen into a severe state of disrepair. The tomb was scarred by graffiti. The roof leaked, the granite was cracked, and the area was used by the homeless as a latrine and encampment and a drug haven by drug users. Scaturro regarded the desecration of Grant's Tomb as a national disgrace.

The tomb was administered by the National Park Service, part of the U.S. Department of the Interior. Scaturro volunteered with the Park Service to conduct guided tours at the site while he was a Columbia University undergraduate. He alerted Park Service officials that the tomb urgently needed repair, but to no avail. Scaturro persisted with regular memoranda to Park Service bureaucrats, including a 26-page report submitted in the summer of 1992. For over two years, Park Service officials simply ignored him. Undeterred, Scaturro went public with a 325-page whistleblowing report he sent to Congress and the President. His efforts drew national media attention, including a 1994 New York Times editorial entitled "Dishonor for a Hero President" which said, "the tomb's lamentable condition demands more funds from Washington." Scaturro also sued the Interior Department and National Park Service in federal court to force it to fulfill its legal duties to the public. His efforts paid off. Congress tripled the site's operations budget, including funds for security during off hours when the site was closed, and appropriated $1.8 million for a full restoration. Scaturro explained to reporters, "I only did what I did because I had no other resort ... the only thing left was abandoning the site, and that was not an alternative to me." Restoration was completed by April 27, 1997, the 100th anniversary of the site's dedication and Grant's 175th birthday. It was re-dedicated that day. Grant's descendants, appalled by the prior condition of the tomb, hailed Scaturro as a hero.

== Campaigns for United States Congress ==
=== 2010 ===
In 2010, Scaturro made his first bid for the Republican nomination to represent New York's 4th congressional district in Nassau County. After Scaturro gained momentum to defeat the Democratic incumbent, Carolyn McCarthy, the chairman of Nassau County's notorious Republican machine, Joseph Mondello, hand-picked a machine stalwart, Nassau County legislator, Francis Becker, to defeat Scaturro. Nationally syndicated columnist Michael Barone opined that Mondello preferred to "boot an election in order to maintain his own personal power."

In a three-way primary, Becker won with 11,194 votes to Scaturro's 8,241 and Dan Maloney's 3,192. McCarthy beat Becker in the general election 94,483 votes to 81,718.

=== 2012 ===
A federal court unexpectedly ordered the primary for Congress take place on June 26, yielding a very low turnout. With only 7% of registered Republicans voting, Becker narrowly won the primary with 6,836 votes to Scaturro's 5,531. Nonetheless, Scaturro won the Conservative Party primary by a write-in vote—a first in the modern history of New York State for an electoral district that size. In the general election, Scaturro won 15,603 votes on the Conservative line, despite the absence of a get-out-the-vote drive, the effects of Hurricane Sandy, and a national Democratic wave. Scaturro's success on a minor party line was greater than that of any congressional candidate in the 4th District since 1986. He also received over 40% more votes within the district on the Conservative Party line than Republican-Conservative presidential candidate, Mitt Romney, and U.S. Senate candidate, Wendy Long.

=== 2014 ===
On October 21, 2013, Scaturro announced he would run again to challenge Congresswoman Carolyn McCarthy to represent New York's 4th Congressional District. News media reported McCarthy, a nurse and lifelong smoker, was suffering from lung cancer, and on January 8, 2014, she announced that she would not seek reelection. Democrats then announced their bid to win this open "purple" seat. Syndicated columnist Michael Barone wrote that Scaturro "has a serious chance to win the Republican as well as Conservative nomination this year... [in what] could be a much more seriously contested seat than it was [in 2012]."

On January 29, 2014, Democrat and Nassau County District Attorney, Kathleen Rice, announced she would run for the 4th District seat. It was reported she would face a primary contest from Nassau County legislator Kevan Abrahams. Rice was endorsed by nine-term incumbent McCarthy. As of the January 31, 2014, FEC filing deadline, Scaturro was the only Republican candidate to have raised money, with over $113,000 cash on hand. The Nassau County Republican Committee and the Conservative Party both nominated Bruce Blakeman to face Rice but Scaturro primaried Blakeman and lost badly. Blakeman beat Scaturro in every town and won by over 30 points.
