= Maniac Chase =

1903 short film by Edwin S. Porter

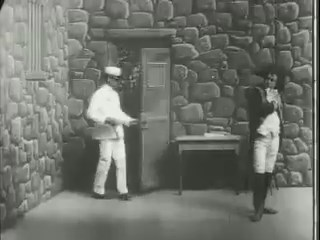
- Directed by: Edwin S. Porter
- Distributed by: Edison Manufacturing Company
- Release date: October 7, 1904
- Running time: 8 minutes
- Country: United States
- Languages: Silent film English inter-titles

Maniac Chase is a 1904 American short silent comedy film directed by Edwin S. Porter and produced by the Edison Manufacturing Company. The film is a remake of The Escaped Lunatic, a film directed by Wallace McCutcheon Sr. released at the beginning of 1904. This was one of two Biograph Company hits remade by Edison's company in fall 1904, the other being Personal, which was copied as How a French Nobleman Got a Wife Through the New York Herald Personal Columns.

== Plot ==
Maniac Chase (1904)

A man dressed as Napoleon is locked in a cell. After a fight with three male nurses, he breaks the bars of his window and runs away followed by the nurses. After overcoming various obstacles, he comes back to his cell.

== History ==
This film is an example of the way in which American production companies were filming remakes of successful films by their competitors. In this case, Edwin Porter, for the Edison Manufacturing Company not only copied the plot of The Escaped Lunatic directed by Wallace McCutcheon for the American Mutoscope and Biograph Company at the end of 1903 and released at the beginning of 1904, but also copied most of the shots. This was regarded as an "ethical equivalent" to the earlier practice of "duping", i.e. making illegal copies of films made by other firms, which had been made impossible with the clarification of copyright law through court cases. In this case, the remake was successful because the Biograph Company's practice at the time was to show its films on its own circuit for up to nine months before selling them to other exhibitors; Edison's copy made the popular film available to independent exhibitors.

Porter's film however brings a few new elements, notably more elaborate camera panning in shots 2 and 11, and the use of reverse motion for shot 5 where the characters seem to fly away into a tree. This increases the unreal feeling of the chase and, combined with the fact that when the protagonist comes back to his cell, he finds intact the table that he had previously broken, suggests that the whole chase may have been imagined by the madman.

The film is mentioned by Douglas Gomery and Clara Pafort-Overduin as having contributed to the popularity of comic chase films which made the continuity structure a widespread practice.

== Analysis ==
The film is composed of 12 shots, 10 of them filmed on location while the first and last one use the same set:

1. A man dressed as Napoleon in a cell. He attacks a male nurse who brings his meal but two more nurses come in and forcefully restrain him. When they have left, he breaks the bars of the window and escapes.

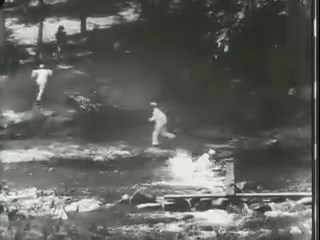
Screenshot

2. A forest path in front of the asylum. The man climbs down the wall and runs away pursued by the nurses. The camera pans left to follow them. As they run across a stream on a log bridge, one of the nurses falls into the water.

3. The pursuit continues on a road.

4. The man hides in a barrel and rolls down a slope but the nurses see him and run after him.

5. The chase continues in a forest. The man jumps in a tree followed by the nurses (filmed in reverse motion). The camera pans to the right to another tree where the man and the comes down.

6. A haystack with a sleeping soldier. The man takes the soldier's gun but he is surrounded by the nurses. He nevertheless manages to escape.

7. The man takes refuge in a house, followed by the nurses. He reappears on top of the roof and slides down still pursued by them.

8. A road. The man hides on the side and the nurses pass by him but they come back and continue the chase.

9. Front view of a bridge. The nurses catch the man and try to restrain him.

10. Side view of the bridge. One of the nurses falls down while the others run on the bridge.

11. Same view as the beginning of shot 2. The man runs towards the asylum and climbs up the window.

12. Same view as shot 1. The man enters his cell through the window. He sits at the table and reads a document. The nurses enter the cell and are flabbergasted to find him there.
