= Grant's Tomb =

Mausoleum in Manhattan, New York

- General Grant National Memorial
- U.S. National Register of Historic Places
- U.S. National Memorial
- New York State Register of Historic Places
- New York City Landmark
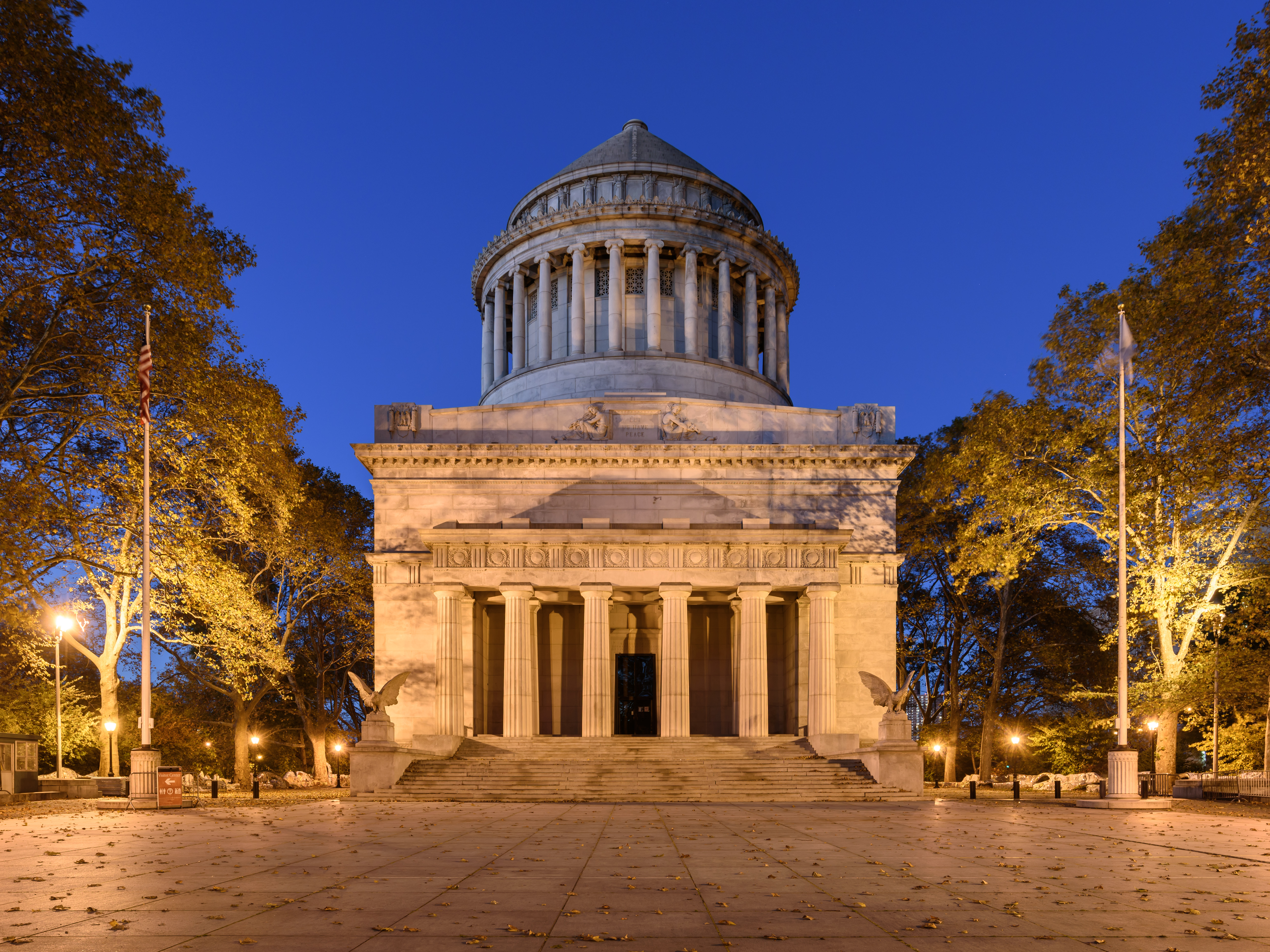
- Grant's Tomb at dusk
- Location of Grant's Tomb in New York City
- Location: Riverside Drive and West 122nd Street; Manhattan, New York, U.S.
- Coordinates: 40°48′48″N 73°57′47″W
- Area: 0.76 acres (0.31 ha)
- Built: April 27, 1897
- Architect: John H. Duncan
- Architectural style: Neoclassical
- Visitation: 63,152 (2025)
- Website: General Grant National Memorial
- NRHP reference No.: 66000055
- NYSRHP No.: 06101.001260
- NYCL No.: 0900, 0901

Significant dates
- Added to NRHP: October 15, 1966
- Designated NMEM: August 14, 1958
- Designated NYSRHP: June 23, 1980
- Designated NYCL: November 25, 1975

Grant's Tomb, officially the General Grant National Memorial, is the final resting place of Ulysses S. Grant, the 18th president of the United States, and of his wife Julia. It is a classical domed mausoleum in the Morningside Heights neighborhood of Upper Manhattan in New York City, New York, U.S. The structure is in the median of Riverside Drive at 122nd Street, just east of Riverside Park. In addition to being a national memorial since 1958, Grant's Tomb is listed on the National Register of Historic Places, and its facade and interior are New York City designated landmarks.

Upon Grant's death in July 1885, his widow indicated his wish to be interred in New York. Within days, a site in Riverside Park was selected, and the Grant Monument Association (GMA) was established to appeal for funds. Although the GMA raised $100,000 in its first three months, the group only raised an additional $55,000 in the next five years. After two architectural competitions in 1889 and 1890, the GMA selected a proposal by John Hemenway Duncan for a tomb modeled after the Mausoleum at Halicarnassus. Following a renewed fundraising campaign, the cornerstone was laid in 1892, and the tomb was completed on April 27, 1897, Grant's 75th birthday.

Initially, the GMA managed the tomb with a $7,000 annual appropriation from the city. The tomb was extensively renovated in the late 1930s with help from Works Progress Administration workers, who added murals and restored the interior. The National Park Service took over the operation of Grant's Tomb in 1959. After a period of neglect and vandalism, the tomb was restored in the 1990s following a campaign led by college student Frank Scaturro. Despite various modifications over the years, some portions of the monument were never completed, including a planned equestrian statue outside the tomb.

The mausoleum's base is shaped like a rectangle with colonnades on three sides and a portico in front, on the south side. The upper section consists of a cylindrical mass with a colonnade and a stepped dome. Inside, the main level of the memorial is shaped like a Greek cross, with four barrel-vaulted exhibition spaces extending off a domed central area. The Grants' bodies are placed in red-granite sarcophagi above ground in a lower-level crypt. Over the years, the design of Grant's Tomb has received mixed commentary, and the tomb has been depicted in several films.

== Context and planning ==
Ulysses S. Grant was born in 1822 and led the Union Army to victory during the American Civil War, then served as the 18th president of the United States from 1869 to 1877. Grant was bankrupt at the end of his life. Days after Grant published his memoirs to raise money, he died of throat cancer at age 63 in Wilton, New York, on July 23, 1885. The American public still held Grant in high regard when he died: his empty casket drew 15,000 mourners on July 26, and Americans and foreigners alike wrote thousands of letters expressing their condolences.

In his will, Grant had indicated that he wished to be interred in St. Louis, Missouri, or Galena, Illinois, where his family owned plots in local cemeteries, or in New York City, where he had lived in his final years. His friend, publisher George William Childs, said the president had previously expressed a desire to be buried at the Old Soldier's Home in Washington, D.C., or at West Point. Ulysses wanted his wife Julia to eventually be interred next to him; at the time, military cemeteries and installations such as West Point did not permit women's interments. The Grant family decided against burying him at Galena because that site was not easily accessible, and other sites in Springfield, Illinois, and Troy, New York, were also rejected.

=== Creation of Grant Monument Association ===
After Grant died, there were many calls for a monument honoring him. On the same day as Ulysses's death, William Russell Grace, the mayor of New York City, sent a telegram to Julia offering New York City as the burial ground for both Grants. Grace gave Julia a list of city parks where her husband could be buried, and she agreed to have Ulysses's remains interred in New York City. Grace wrote a letter to prominent New Yorkers on July 24, 1885, to gather support for a national monument in Grant's honor:

Dear Sir: In order that the City of New York, which is to be the last resting place of General Grant, should initiate a movement to provide for the erection of a National Monument to the memory of the great soldier, and that she should do well and thoroughly her part, I respectfully request you to act as one of a Committee to consider ways and means for raising the quota to be subscribed by the citizens of New York City for this object, and beg that you will attend a meeting to be held at the Mayor's office on Tuesday next, 28 inst., at three o'clock ...

The preliminary meeting was attended by 85 New Yorkers who established the Committee on Organization. Twenty attendees created an executive committee to make decisions on the group's behalf. On July 29, the Committee on Organization was incorporated as the Grant Monument Association (GMA). Its chairman was Chester A. Arthur, the 21st U.S. president, and its secretary was Richard Theodore Greener, the first black alumnus of Harvard College. Mayor Grace, former U.S. secretary of state Hamilton Fish, and financier J. P. Morgan were named vice chairmen. The association had "between 100 and 150" members in total, including numerous sitting and retired politicians. The Mutual Life Insurance Company of New York allowed the GMA to use an office in one of its buildings. (Note: The original headquarters of the GMA was in one of Mutual Life's buildings at Liberty and Nassau Street in Lower Manhattan, though the GMA moved to 146 Broadway afterward. After 1892, the headquarters was in the Mills Building.)

=== Site selection and temporary tomb ===
City officials initially planned to bury Grant in Central Park, and the family examined three sites in the park. (Note: Namely Central Park South, the Central Park Mall, and the Great Hill) The general public greatly opposed the plans, and the Grant family believed the sites in Central Park were too small to fit both Ulysses and Julia. The family then considered another site in Riverside Park on Manhattan's Upper West Side; though the site was undeveloped, many local businessmen and politicians endorsed the park as the Grants' burial site. On July 28, city officials decided to bury Grant in Riverside Park after his family agreed to the change. The Riverside Park site was perched atop a bluff.

The day after the Grant family decided on the site, Jacob Wrey Mould designed a temporary tomb. The structure was rectangular in plan, with a door and a Christian cross facing the Hudson River. It was enclosed by brick walls and a barrel-vaulted roof. Grant's coffin was to be placed slightly below ground level, and a semicircular driveway was built around the tomb. Work on the temporary tomb began on July 29 and took nine days to complete. Grant was interred on August 8, following a funeral with up to 1.5 million attendees. The temporary tomb briefly became one of the city's most popular sites, with an estimated 30,000 to 40,000 visitors on August 16 alone. Benches were installed in the area, and guidebooks were sold to visitors. Thirty soldiers were stationed outside the tomb, which was nicknamed "Camp Grant". Many passersby tried to obtain pieces of the tomb. The public continued to visit and leave mementos during late 1885.

The site of the permanent tomb had yet to be finalized when Grant was interred. The city's park commissioners had tentatively decided to place the tomb in Riverside Park between 122nd and 127th Streets, but Frederick Law Olmsted, one of the park's designers was unenthusiastic about this plan. By mid-August, the city's park commissioners had asked Vaux and engineer William Barclay Parsons to determine the boundaries of a permanent memorial site for Grant's tomb. Officials also planned to construct a road north of the tomb to separate it from the rest of Riverside Park. The park commissioners set aside a 650-by-250-foot (198 by 76 m) site on Riverside Drive, between 121st and 124th Streets, for the monument in October 1885. The tomb had spurred real estate development in the area, and the Manhattan Railway Company had proposed constructing an elevated line to the tomb by the end of 1886. Some members of the public claimed the relatively remote site had been selected only to attract tourists and encourage real estate development, although the surrounding area was built up in the 1890s.

=== Fundraising ===
==== Initial efforts and opposition ====
The Grant Monument Association did not originally announce the function or structure of the monument, but the idea drew public support nonetheless. The New-York Tribune had suggested the idea of a permanent monument on July 26, three days after he died. On July 29, the day the GMA was established, Western Union donated $5,000 to the association's fund. (Note: Equivalent to $179,000 in 2025) The GMA continued to receive large and small donations, and the fund surpassed $50,000 in less than a month. (Note: Equivalent to $1,792,000 in 2025) At a membership meeting on August 20, the committee set a fundraising goal of $1 million, (Note: Equivalent to $35.8 million in 2025) spurred by a suggestion from former governor Alonzo B. Cornell. Funding came from such sources as private companies and benefit concerts. Fundraising had slowed down by the end of August 1885, in part because of the GMA members' lackadaisical attitude, as well as the existence of a competing association with the same name in Illinois.

Although there was great enthusiasm for a monument to Grant, early fundraising efforts were stifled by growing negative public opinion expressed by out-of-state press. The opposition was vocal in the view that the monument should be in Washington, D.C. Grace tried to calm the controversy by publicly releasing Julia's justification for the Riverside Park site as the resting place for her husband in October 1885. Even though many major newspapers published Julia's statement, this failed to boost fundraising.

Riverside was selected by myself and my family as the burial place of my husband, General Grant. First, because I believed New York was his preference. Second, it is near the residence that I hope to occupy as long as I live, and where I will be able to visit his resting place often. Third, I have believed, and am now convinced, that the tomb will be visited by as many of his countrymen there as it would be at any other place. Fourth, the offer of a park in New York was the first which observed and unreservedly assented to the only condition imposed by General Grant himself, namely, that I should have a place by his side.

— Julia Dent Grant

There was also discontent with the management of the GMA, whose members were among the city's wealthiest but made comparatively small donations. The New York Times characterized the members as "sitting quietly in an office and signing receipts for money voluntarily tendered". Furthermore, the GMA still had no definite plan for the monument, which frustrated and discouraged donors. Joan Waugh wrote in her book, U.S. Grant: American Hero, American Myth: "Why should citizens give money to build a monument whose shape was still a mystery?" Many of the GMA's members also had responsibilities of their own and could not devote their full attention to the project. Ten of the GMA's executive meetings were canceled in four months because there were not enough members to form a quorum. The GMA had raised $100,000 by November, and the fund totaled $111,000 by the end of the year, following lackluster fundraising efforts that netted as little as $1.50 on some days.

==== Slowdown in fundraising ====
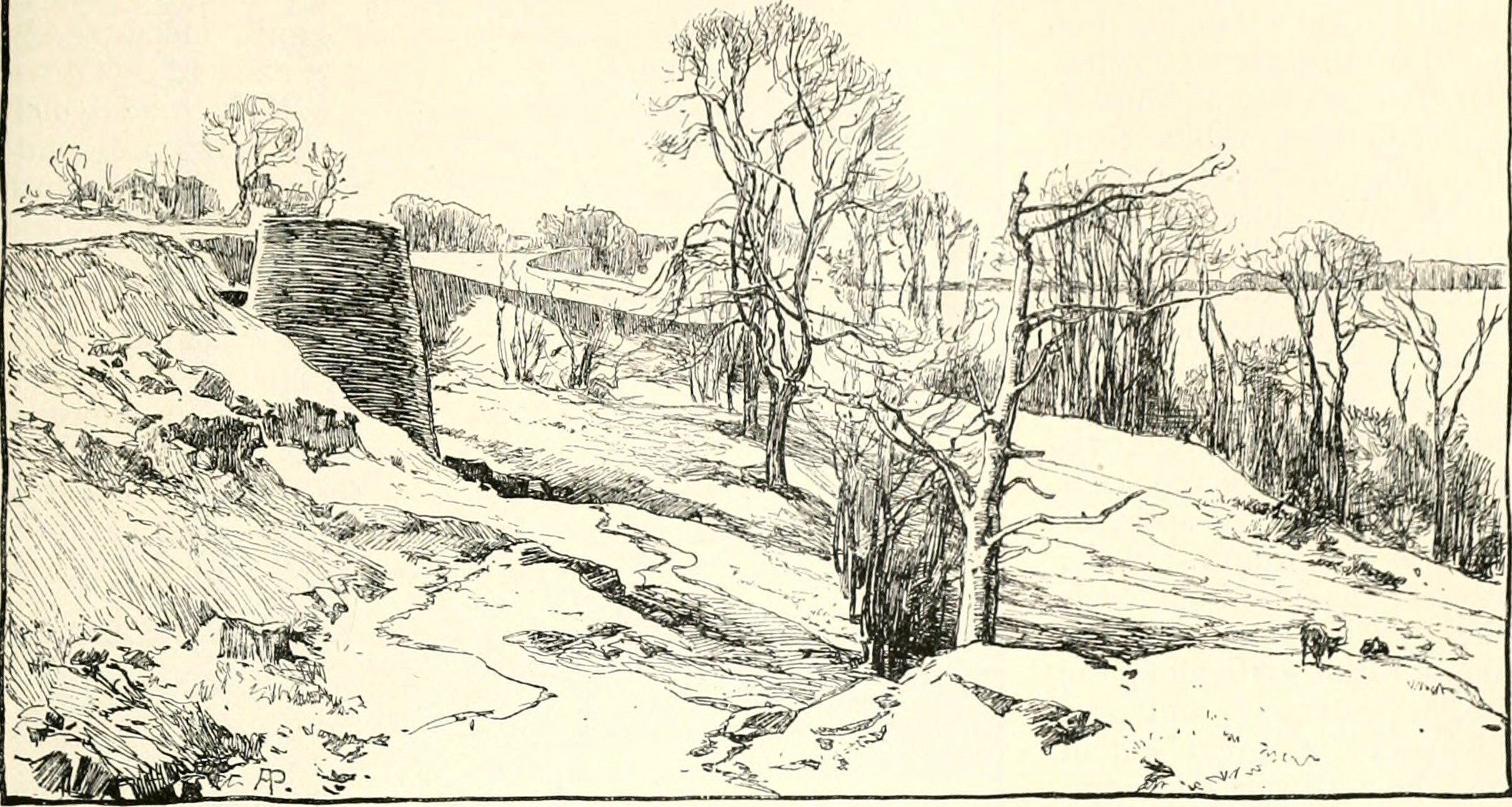
Future site of tomb, 1886

A bill was proposed in the United States Congress in January 1886, which would have provided $500,000 for the project (later reduced to $250,000). This allocation would have been provided after the GMA had independently raised $250,000, but the bill failed because it did not receive unanimous consent. By February 1886, the fund had raised $115,000, much less than the $500,000 that the association had expected by that time. A new Grant Monument Association was legally incorporated that month, with 29 trustees and four politicians who were ex officio members. The reorganized GMA held its first meeting in March, superseding the old association, and had raised either $123,000 or $129,000 by the first anniversary of Grant's death. Despite uncertainty over the permanent tomb's fate, the temporary tomb hosted events such as a Memorial Day ceremony in May 1886.

U.S. troops continued to patrol Grant's tomb until June 1886, when city park police began patrolling the tomb. Although the presence of Grant's temporary tomb had attracted visitors to Riverside Park, the number of visitors to the tomb had tapered off by the middle of that year. The fund continued to receive small donations from such sources as a benefit concert at the Metropolitan Opera House and the Nickel Fund Association of Montclair, New Jersey. Julia donated $987.50, while a puzzle contest at the end of 1886 raised another $1,000. The fund had raised only $10,000 during the entire 1886–1887 fiscal year, and it raised the same amount during the following fiscal year. By the late 1880s, some trustees had resigned because of frustration over the fund, and the Grant family was considering interring the former president somewhere else.

== Design and construction ==
=== Unsolicited plans ===
As fundraising slowed down, people began to lose confidence in the Grant Monument Association, and members of the public offered their own proposals for the memorial. When American Architect and Building News hosted an architectural design competition in late 1885, some members of the public erroneously thought the competition was the official one. Although the American Institute of Architects (AIA) recommended that the GMA host a formal competition, the association ignored this advice and did not contact other groups that had built similar monuments. Instead, in October 1885, the GMA started requesting proposals from "artists, architects, and all others". Richard Greener had drafted plans for a design competition, but the invitations never went out, and the GMA's January 1886 promise to select a design "at once" did not happen.

The association continued to receive proposals through 1886. According to historian David Kahn, one plan by Calvert Vaux was "so complicated that written descriptions give little idea of what it was actually intended to look like", while The New York Times said another plan would "frighten people ... completely away from the fund". By November 1886, the GMA was planning to erect a permanent memorial. Within a few months, the GMA had received "a number of designs, sketches and suggestions" from across America and Europe, with 14 plans being submitted by February 1887. Among the plans the association received were those by American sculptor William Wetmore Story, German sculptor Joseph Echteler, and architect George Matthias. Greener began writing to other groups, such as the Garfield National Monument Association, for advice in early 1887, and he hired Napoleon LeBrun as consulting architect.

=== Design competitions ===
==== First design competition ====
In June 1887, the GMA formally announced a design competition for the memorial, with a deadline of October 31. Under the terms of the competition, the memorial was to be made in bronze, marble, granite, or "other appropriate material". The GMA did not respond to several requests for clarification, and some days after the deadline, Greener claimed that "no time line had ever been fixed". The editorial team of The New York Times contrasted the GMA's inefficiency against the rapid development of the nearby Cathedral of St. John the Divine.

On February 4, 1888, after a year's delay, the GMA publicly announced a design competition with a budget of $500,000, (Note: Equivalent to $17.9 million in 2025) although the budget could be increased if necessary. As was common practice at the time, architects were requested to submit their proposals anonymously; the five best plans would receive cash prizes. The AIA objected to the rules of the competition; the GMA ignored both the AIA's complaints and those of other architectural associations, though it changed the rules slightly. After many of the competitors requested extra time for their designs, the original deadline of November 1, 1888, was rescheduled twice to January 10, 1889. The GMA had raised $130,000 at the time of the competition. (Note: Equivalent to $4.7 million in 2025)

The first competition received 65 entries, of which 42 came from outside the United States. Some of the plans had been submitted to the American Architect and Building News three years earlier, and about one-third of these entries had intact drawings or illustrations by the late 20th century. A panel of six judges selected five winners in April 1889. The winning plan, by Cluss & Schulze of Washington, D.C., called for a mausoleum measuring about 120 by 120 feet (37 by 37 m) across at its base, with a pinnacle measuring 215 to 240 feet (66 to 73 m) high. An equestrian statue of Grant was to be placed in front of the shaft. Though the judges gave out five awards, they did not recommend any of these entries, and many major newspapers, including the Times, derided the plans. The Weekly Mail and Express donated $10,000 at the end of 1889, increasing the fund to $140,000, (Note: The donation is equivalent to $358,000, and the total amount after the donation is equivalent to $5.0 million in 2025) and the GMA distributed awards for the competition in February 1890.

==== Second design competition ====
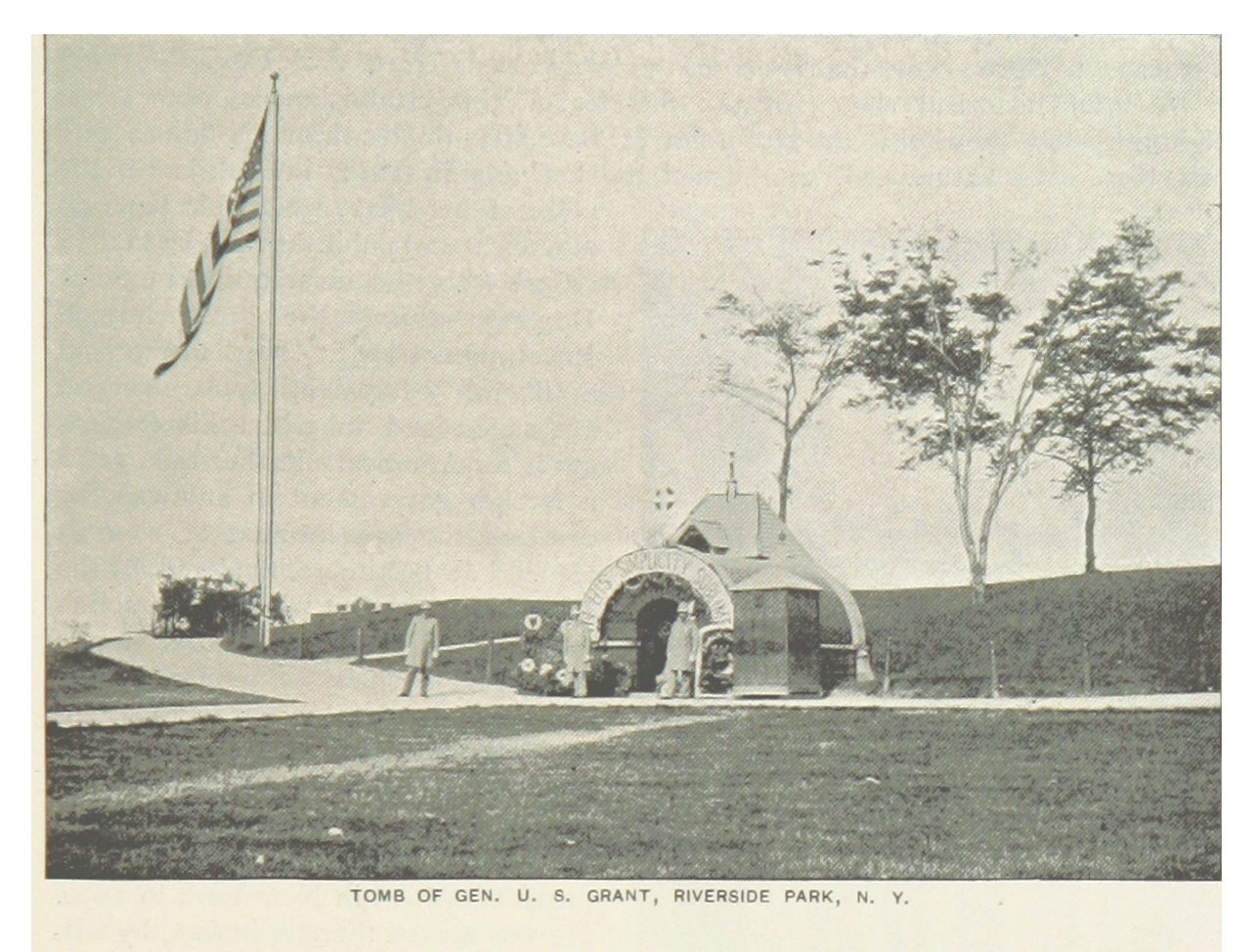
Temporary tomb in Riverside Park, 1893

The failure of the first competition damaged the GMA's reputation further. The Grand Army of the Republic had proposed a competing plan for a temple on the site, and many out-of-state supported the idea of moving Grant's remains to Arlington National Cemetery. The judges for the first competition had recommended in December 1889 that qualified architects be invited to compete in a second competition with more specific rules, and Adolph L. Sanger of the GMA announced at the end of March 1890 that the association would launch a second competition. At the beginning of April, the GMA formally sent out letters to potential competitors. John H. Duncan, Carrère & Hastings, Charles W. Clinton, John Ord, and Napoleon LeBrun were selected to participate. Each contestant was required to design a tall monument with space for a memorial hall and for Ulysses and Julia Grant's coffins. In addition, the plans could not cost more than $500,000. (Note: Equivalent to $17.9 million in 2025)

A bill was introduced in Congress in May 1890, which would provide $250,000 for the monument if the GMA raised $200,000. (Note: Congress's offer is equivalent to $9.0 million, and the amount to be raised is equivalent to $7.2 million in 2025) The same month, the GMA opened a gift shop next to the temporary tomb. Though few details of the second competition were publicly announced, numerous architects attempted to compete anyway. The five competitors wanted the deadline to be extended from July to October, but the GMA only gave each competitor until September 1, as the United States Senate had passed a resolution in August to move Grant's remains to Arlington. Each architect was invited to explain his plan in front of the GMA's executive committee; the designs varied in complexity. On September 9, 1890, the GMA awarded the commission to Duncan, who estimated his design would cost between $496,000 and $900,000. (Note: Equivalent to $17.8–34.4 million in 2025) Duncan wrote that he wanted "to produce a monumental structure that should be unmistakably a tomb of military character" and that he wanted to avoid "resemblance of a habitable dwelling". Duncan's plans called for a square base, a cylindrical shaft, and a pyramidal dome, with a portico in the front and an apse in the rear. (Note: During construction, the apse was eliminated.) The runners-up each received $500 checks. (Note: Equivalent to $17,917 in 2025)

That October, the GMA signed a contract with Duncan. Although there were continued efforts to relocate Grant's remains to Arlington, the House of Representatives voted down the Senate's resolution in December 1890. While representatives from other states favored relocating the president's remains, New York representatives, including Roswell P. Flower and John Raines, were opposed. The GMA had raised only about $150,000 by the start of 1891; the previous four years had netted just $40,000. All "nonessential" design elements, including a $54,000 approach from the Hudson River, were removed from the plans to save money. Although the GMA's members had assumed that the permanent tomb would be built on the same site as the temporary tomb, the city's park commissioners favored a site slightly to the east, within Claremont Park.

=== Construction ===
==== Foundation and fundraising ====
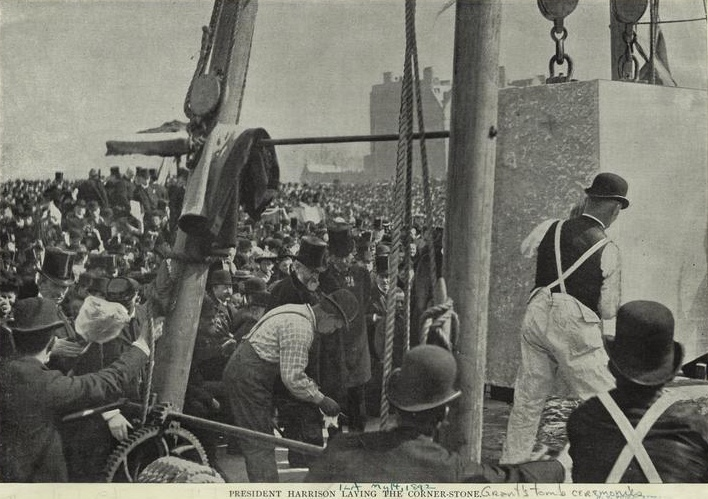
President Harrison lays the ceremonial cornerstone in 1892

A groundbreaking ceremony was hosted on April 27, 1891, on what would have been Grant's 69th birthday, despite confusion over the site. The next week, the GMA awarded a $18,875 contract to John T. Brady for the foundation's construction, and Cornelius Vanderbilt II established a second fund for the Grant Monument. Brady signed a contract for the northern half of the foundation on June 10, and excavations for the foundation began shortly thereafter. The park commissioners and GMA also agreed to build the permanent tomb on the temporary site. Duncan continued to refine and simplify his design through July. After preliminary excavations were completed in August 1891, Brady started constructing the foundation. That October, Brady received a contract for the southern half of the foundation, and the vault holding Grant's coffin was relocated. Over the next month, Brady carefully lifted the vault onto the new concrete foundation.

Meanwhile, the GMA was embroiled in internal disputes over leadership, prompting the resignation of its fourth president William H. Grace (Note: Chester A. Arthur, Sidney Dillon, and Cornelius Vanderbilt II had preceded Grace as president.) and several trustees in late 1891. Grant's friend Horace Porter took over the organization in early 1892 and served in that position for 27 years. Porter soon moved the organization's headquarters, tripled the number of trustees to 100, and discontinued trustees' salaries. The New York State Legislature did not approve a proposal to rename the organization to the Grant Tomb and Monument Association due to a clerical error. The foundations were completed in March. The same month, Brady received a contract to erect the lowest part of the facade with granite from the Union Granite Company's quarries. The GMA's new leadership asked Duncan to downsize the monument to save money. Porter also tried to convince the state legislature to give $500,000 for the monument, but the bill was withdrawn after legislators requested a 10% kickback.

The GMA's funds had stalled at $155,000, so Porter enlisted businessman Edward F. Cragin to raise money and announced plans on March 22 to raise another $350,000 in four weeks. The group reached out to various businesses and trades across the city. The campaign began nine days later, raising funds through newspaper advertisements and public donation boxes, as well as from 185 committees. Mayor Hugh J. Grant (who was unrelated to the Grants) encouraged everyone to give to the fund on April 8. U.S. president Benjamin Harrison laid the permanent cornerstone on April 27, 1892, at which point the campaign had raised $202,800. Another attempt to obtain $250,000 from Congress failed in late May 1892. The total fund exceeded $500,000 by the end of May, more than enough for the entire project; the GMA had raised $350,000 in these two months. The vast majority of the money came from New Yorkers, and the fundraiser had incurred less than $18,000 in expenses. Fundraising continued through early 1893, at which point $600,000 had been raised from over 90,000 individual donors, making it the world's largest fundraiser ever at the time.

==== Progress and completion ====
The temporary tomb was relocated 75 feet (23 m) north in May 1892, allowing visitors to see the tomb without disrupting work. A stonecutters' strike in New England delayed construction for much of that year, lasting six months. Duncan and Porter began acquiring 16 million pounds (7,300,000 kg) of granite from New England, and Brady was awarded a $104,482 contract to construct the rest of the structure in early 1893. At their annual meeting that February, the GMA's trustees awarded a granite contract to the Maine and New Hampshire Granite Company, with a completion date of late 1895. The company was ready to deliver granite for the superstructure by June 1893. However, Brady could not accept the granite because the monument's water table needed to be fixed. In response to a media inquiry that October, Duncan blamed the contractors for the delays. By the end of 1893, the water table was the only completed above-ground portion of the tomb.

At the GMA's 1894 annual meeting, the trustees changed the completion date to early 1896. Trains began delivering granite to the site in May 1894. After finding that some of the stone had coal-dust stains, Duncan threatened to reject any granite that was stained, and he returned any stones with stains greater than 0.25 in (6.4 mm) in diameter. The monument had been built to a height of 45 feet (14 m) by December 1894, when work was paused due to cold weather. Further slowdowns occurred in early 1895 due to delays in delivering granite and disputes over smoke from a construction hoist. The base had topped out by that May, and the monument had reached 85 ft (26 m) when work was paused at the end of the year. Duncan had also begun soliciting estimates for interior work.

The GMA reported at its 1896 meeting that the completion date had been changed to early 1897. Although a dedication was supposed to occur on April 25, before the tomb was even complete, one newspaper reported that "not a flower was to be seen" on Grant's birthday two days later. Work on the steel frame of the monument's roof had resumed in early 1896, and the roof was completed by the middle of that year, with the scaffolding being removed in July. The Department of Parks announced plans that August to spend $120,000 on terraces and paths around the monument, although the department did not approve several other proposals for the area, which included a system of boulevards leading to the monument. The stonework on the facade was completed the next month. Brady received the contract for the interior work. The initial plans, entailing one sarcophagus for both Grants, were changed to two sarcophagi before the monument was finished. The red granite for Grant's sarcophagus was delivered in March 1897. The front doors were installed on April 12, marking the completion of all work.

== Use as monument ==
=== Opening ===
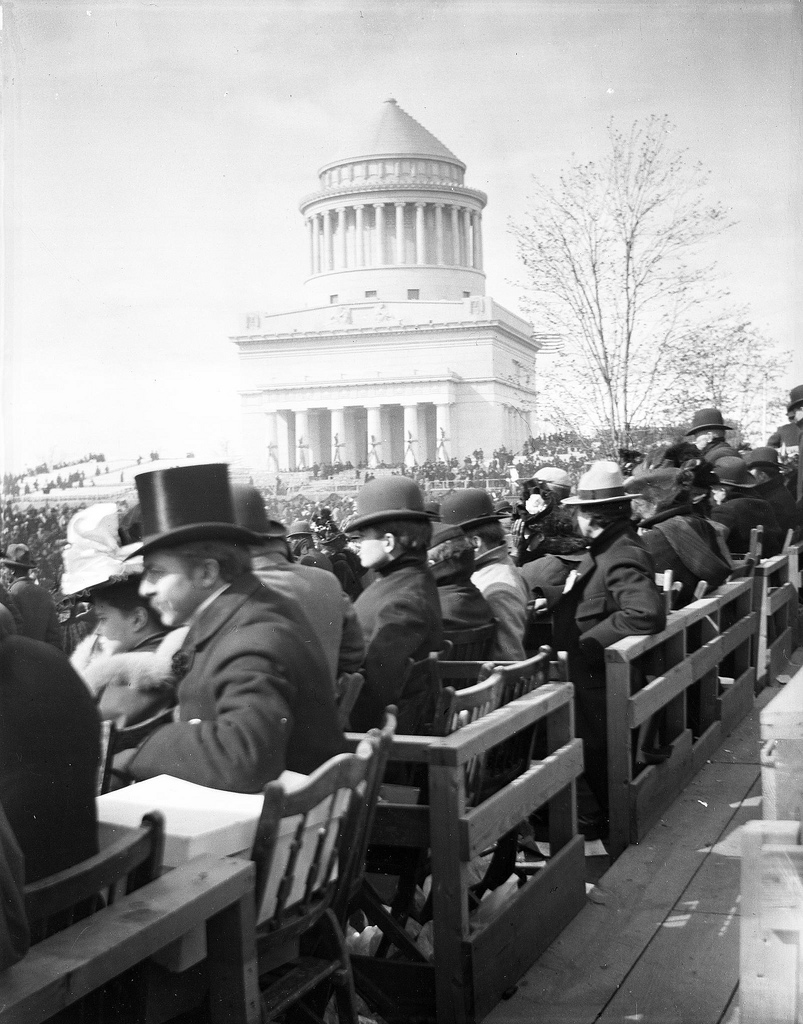
Grant's Tomb on dedication day, April 27, 1897

The New York City Board of Estimate budgeted $50,000 in 1896 just for the monument's opening ceremony. Grant's remains were transferred to the sarcophagus on April 17, 1897, and placed in the mausoleum. Brady was awarded a $20,250 contract to build a temporary triumphal arch and a grandstand for the ceremony. On April 25, two days before the dedication, the tomb had an estimated 200,000 visitors. The state legislature had declared the day of the dedication, April 27, 1897, as a state holiday in four New York City-area counties. The dedication marked what would have been Grant's 75th birthday. Despite inclement weather, the dedication drew an estimated one million spectators, as well as more than 50,000 marchers who paraded to the tomb from Madison Square Park 6 miles (9.7 km) to the south.

The grandstand was disassembled after the ceremony, although the temporary arch remained for another month. Bricks from the temporary tomb were sent to Grand Army posts across the U.S.; other members of the public also requested the temporary tomb's bricks but were denied. To avoid stampedes, the tomb was closed to the public until the day after the dedication, when between ten and fifteen thousand people entered the monument. Policemen were stationed outside the monument to direct crowds, although a 24-hour patrol of Grant's Tomb was withdrawn shortly after the monument opened. Chinese diplomat Yang Yü planted a ginkgo biloba tree next to the tomb in May 1897, honoring Grant on behalf of Li Hongzhang. A memorial tablet was placed near the tree that September.

=== GMA operation ===
The New York City government initially did not provide any appropriation for the tomb's maintenance. In November 1897, the Department of Parks agreed to pay the GMA $7,000 annually to maintain the monument for 11 years. George D. Burnside, who had been a foreman during the monument's construction, was hired as the first curator, serving for nearly five decades. Julia's sarcophagus was placed in the tomb in January 1898. The monument's policies included a loud-talking ban and a requirement that men take off their hats. Grant's Tomb attracted 560,000 visitors in its first eight months, and it consistently recorded at least 500,000 annual visitors over the next few years. Most visitors arrived to the site by either elevated railway, carriage, bicycle, or boat, although some traveled there on foot. The Grand Army of the Republic hosted annual ceremonies at the tomb on Grant's birthday and on Memorial Day until 1929.

==== 1900s to mid-1920s ====
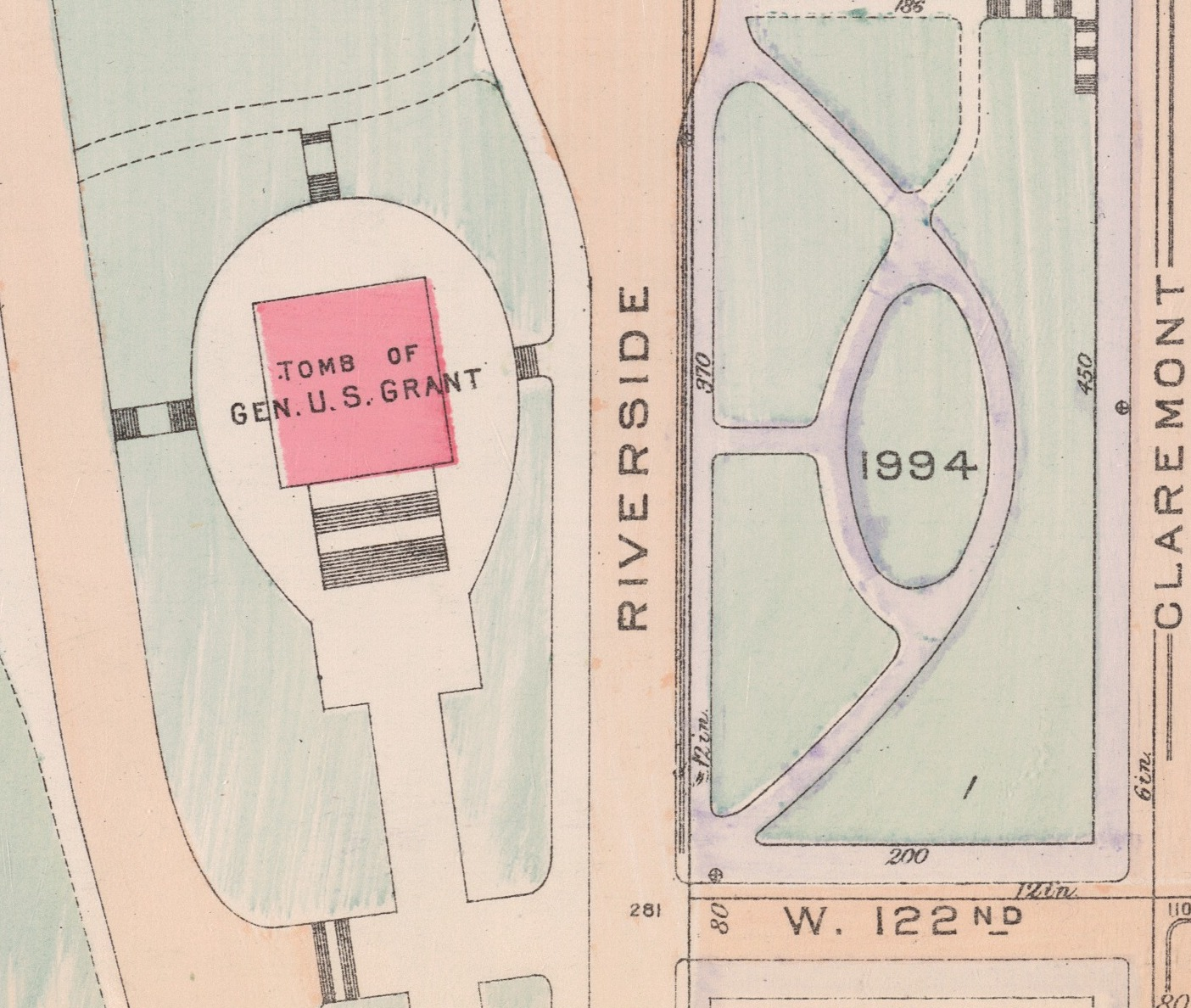
Tomb on map in 1916

Most visitors in the early 20th century generally adhered to the monument's strict rules. Some visitors talked loudly, loitered, vandalized, or roller-skated on the steps, and "relic hunters" took pieces of the monument. The New York City Board of Estimate provided $300,000 in early 1901 for "general improvements" to the area around Grant's Tomb. Julia died on December 14, 1902, and she was placed in her sarcophagus the week afterward. The Grant family donated to the GMA several thousand letters written by Ulysses, and battle flags were placed in the reliquary rooms at the tomb's northwest and northeast corners in 1903. The GMA requested in early 1904 that the state fund a heating plant in the tomb. The monument had also started to leak, causing the plaster to flake off. As such, in late 1904, workers coated the interior with paraffin wax to reduce leaks; the work was completed the next year.

In its early years, Grant's Tomb attracted more visitors than the Statue of Liberty did, with around 600,000 visitors in 1906. The monument also attracted many foreign delegations, as well as ceremonies and demonstrations. The city renewed its contract with the GMA in 1908 for 21 years, continuing to pay the association $7,000 annually. The next year, three policemen were temporarily stationed outside the tomb to deter vandals. A pavilion with restrooms was erected to the west of Grant's Tomb in 1910 at a cost of $45,000, replacing a temporary wooden structure there. A set of Japanese cherry trees were planted behind the tomb in 1912. The same year, Duncan recommended "urgent" repairs to the tomb and surrounding pavement, as he believed the foundations had been undermined due to improper drainage. The GMA paid Louis Comfort Tiffany $975 for nine purple stained-glass windows on the monument, which were installed in March 1913. The Parks Department also planned to repair the pavement, and there were plans to install statuary once sufficient funds had been raised. A wooden booth for the staff was installed next to the entrance in 1915.

The number of visitors was in decline by the 1910s, in part since many Civil War veterans were dying, and many younger Americans were unaware of Grant's importance to previous generations. World War I and the growing popularity of amusement parks, theaters, and sports also negatively impacted visitor numbers; by the end of the 1910s, the tomb had only 300,000 annual visitors. The tomb was originally illuminated by gas jets at night, but these were replaced by electric lamps in 1923. Additionally, the tomb continued to have drainage problems: by 1925, one corner was sagging by 2 inches (5.1 cm). This prompted the city to rebuild the plaza outside the tomb in a project which was completed in 1927. During the 1920s, there were several plans to complete the statuary on the tomb, but this had been complicated by Duncan's indecision over the designs. A grove of trees outside the tomb was dedicated in 1928.

==== 1920s and 1930s renovation ====
Multiple modifications, including a statue of Grant on horseback outside Grant's Tomb, were announced in February 1929. This was part of a larger plan designed by John Russell Pope, which included a pediment above the main entrance and an expanded entrance plaza. The GMA began raising funds that month, with plans to obtain $400,000, and the city's Municipal Art Commission approved Pope's plans that March. Pope signed a contract to design the renovation in June 1929, and the GMA had raised $121,000 by September. With the Wall Street Crash of 1929 later the same year, fundraising slowed significantly, but the project was not officially canceled until 1933. Grant's Tomb recorded fewer than 100,000 annual visitors for the first time in its history in 1933, and visitor counts had decreased to fewer than 500 a day. The annual ceremonies at Grant's Tomb were drawing fewer and fewer people, and vandalism was becoming more common. The facade had also become dirty over time.

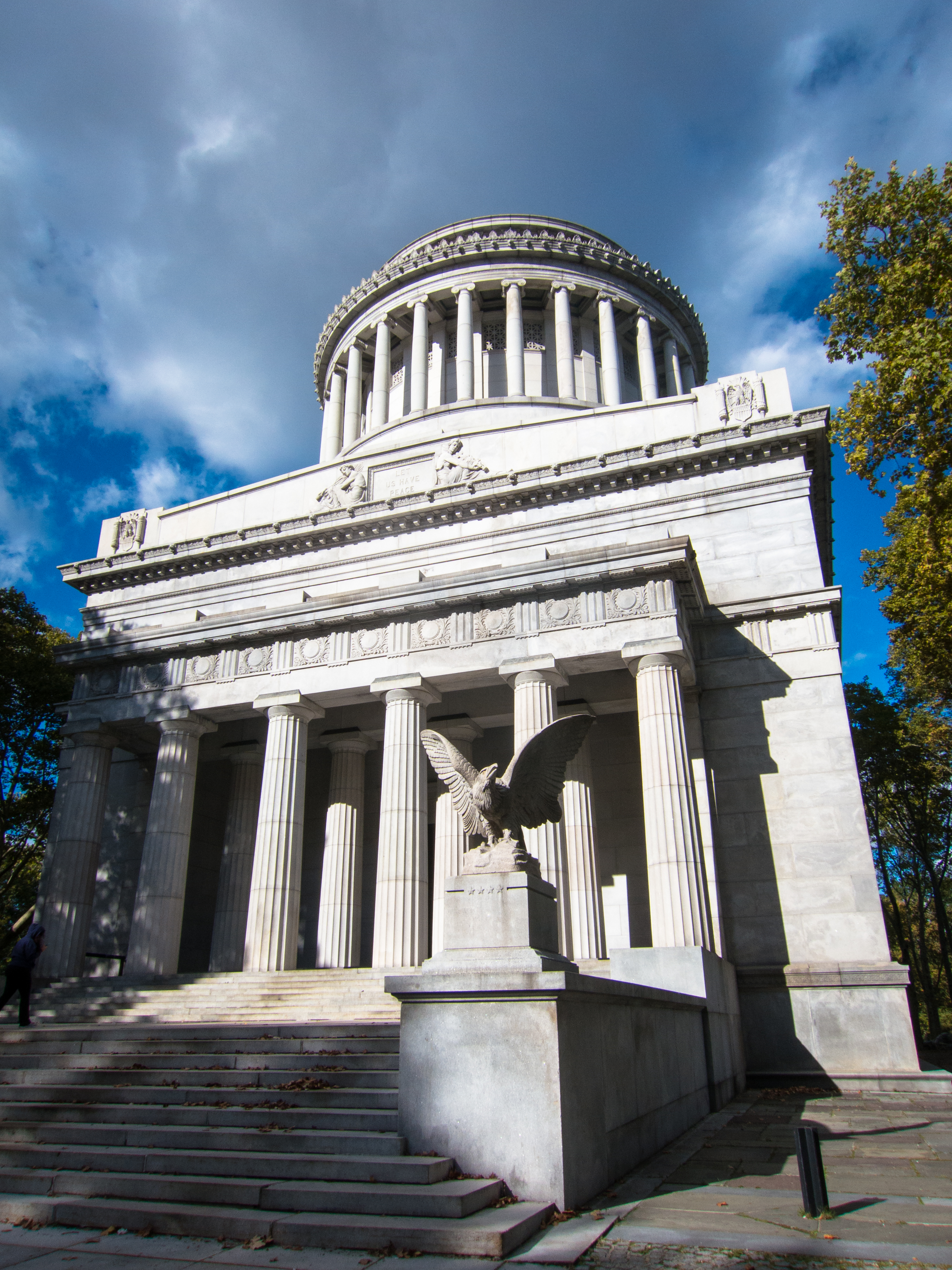
The eagle statues outside Grant's Tomb were salvaged from the New York City Post Office in 1938.

In 1934, the city again renewed its contract with the GMA for 21 years; the $7,000 annual payment was not changed to adjust for inflation. (Note: Equivalent to $168,000 in 2025) Some of Pope's plans were carried out later in the decade. There were plans to clean the monument by July 1935, and Works Progress Administration (WPA) laborers installed new marble flooring that December. According to Joan Waugh, WPA funding and the sale of souvenirs helped keep the tomb solvent. Exposed cables were relocated inside the walls during 1936, and workers completed a 14-month renovation of the roof and part of the interior in May 1937 at a cost of $22,500. In June, the GMA hired Dean Fausett to design two murals of battle maps, which were completed the next year. Swinging racks, bronze markers, a lamp, and a brass lectern were also added for visitors' benefit. The renovation was to be finished before the 1939 New York World's Fair started.

Numerous modifications were made to Grant's Tomb in 1938, including the installation of a heating plant and an air-conditioning system. Workers also installed anti-bird screens, built a plaza around the monument, cleaned the interior of the dome, and relocated the curator's office to the southeast corner. Two eagle statues from the New York City Post Office were relocated to the tomb, and the purple stained-glass panels in nine windows were replaced with amber panels. Artists William Mues and Jeno Juszko designed five busts of Union Army generals around the crypt as part of the Federal Art Project. Four hundred and fifty WPA workers ultimately completed the project by January 1939. Workers installed two flagpoles and exterior floodlights in early April 1939, and the GMA rededicated the tomb on Grant's 117th birthday. The renovation cost either $300,000 or $450,000, of which the GMA paid around $90,000.

==== 1940s and 1950s ====
During the 1930s renovation, the GMA had attempted to add an equestrian statue outside the tomb, which never occurred. The GMA first proposed relocating an existing statue in Brooklyn in 1938; although parks commissioner Robert Moses supported this plan, residents of the borough heavily opposed it. GMA president Herbert L. Satterlee and Grant's grandson Ulysses S. Grant III rejected a model of the statue created by a sculptor named Flinta, as well as another design from William Mues. George D. Burnside's son George G. Burnside took over as the monument's curator in 1940. After the American entry into World War II, the GMA considered closing the monument. The monument ultimately remained open, but the sarcophagi were covered by tarpaulin sheets at night between 1942 and 1945 to protect them from air raid damage. In addition, a silk sheet donated by Japanese citizens was removed in 1944. Vandalism continued to occur, as in 1942 when the cork tree next to the tomb was damaged, and the tomb also saw fewer visitors over the years.

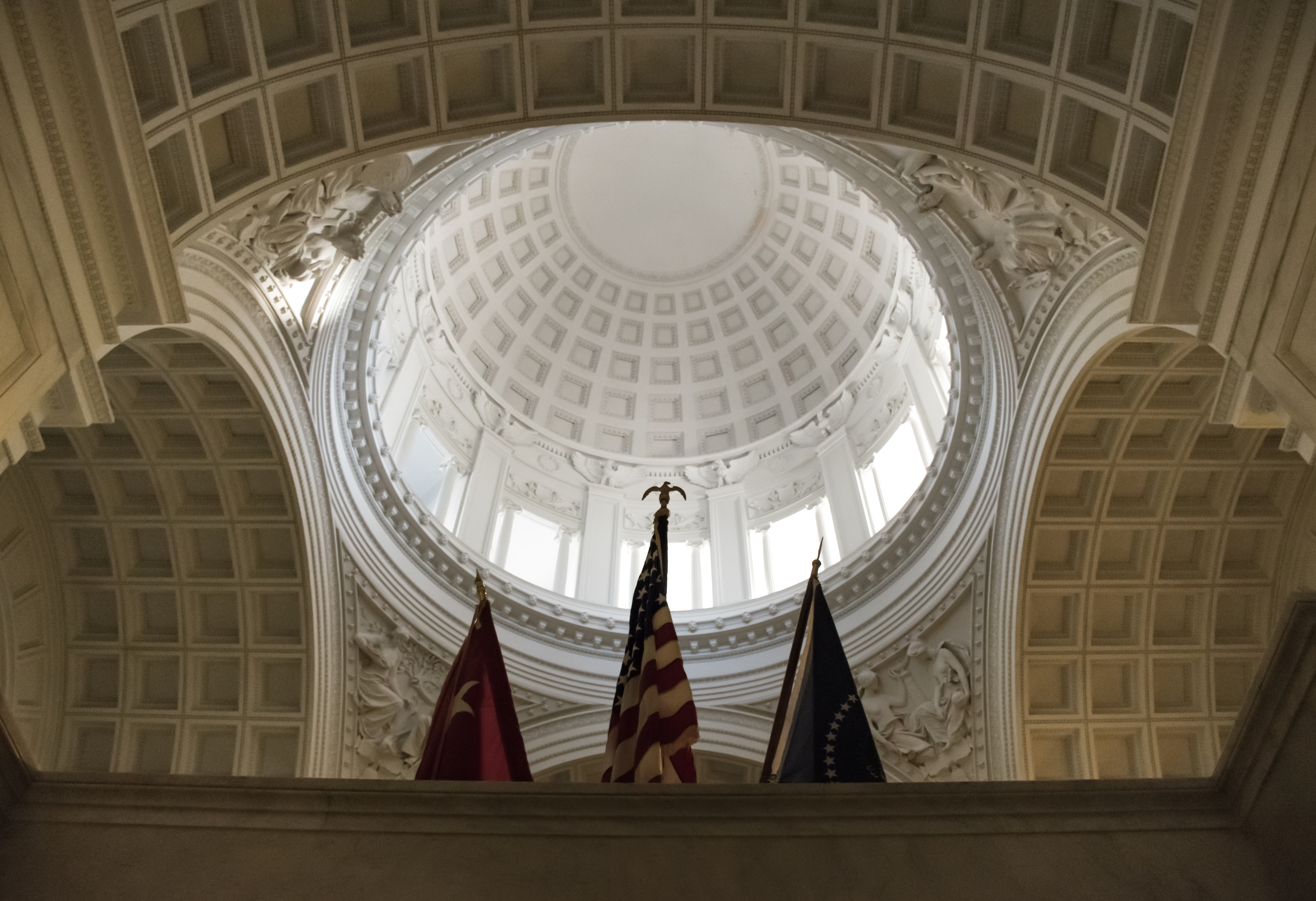
Interior of the tomb, looking up from the stair landing in the memorial's northern arm

By the end of World War II, the tomb was only guarded by New York City Police Department officers when they patrolled the neighborhood. Although annual attendance increased to about 125,000 by the late 1940s, the tomb was becoming dilapidated. There were continued efforts to fund an equestrian statue outside the tomb after the war. The city finally increased its annual appropriation to the GMA in the early 1950s, but even with the increased appropriation, the GMA recorded a net profit of only $230 in 1952. Much of the organization's funding still came from the city, and annual maintenance costs had reached $11,635 by the mid-1950s.

At its 1953 and 1954 meetings, GMA trustees discussed the possibility of transferring the monument to the federal government, but no action was taken in either case. The GMA also wrote a letter to U.S. president Dwight D. Eisenhower, whose secretary rejected the plan, though Eisenhower sent a team to look at the site in late 1955. State lawmakers introduced two bills to transfer the land and the tomb's operation to the federal government in January 1956, and the governor signed the land-transfer bill that March. U.S. representative Herbert Zelenko introduced a bill in early 1957 to transfer the tomb's operation to the United States Department of the Interior, and Eisenhower signed the bill in August 1958 after Congress approved it. The move was expected to save the city $13,000 per year and would cost the federal government $19,000 annually. The Board of Estimate voted to give the site to the federal government in November; the tomb had recorded over 18.6 million all-time visitors at the time.

=== NPS operation ===
The National Park Service (NPS) took over the operations of Grant's Tomb on May 1, 1959, without any ceremony. The structure was officially renamed the General Grant National Memorial. Thomas Pitkin, the tomb's newly appointed historian, wanted to renovate Grant's Tomb to emphasize its role as a memorial rather than as a tomb. Ulysses S. Grant III requested that the NPS keep his grandparents' bodies there.

==== 1960s and 1970s renovations ====
After taking over Grant's Tomb, the NPS wanted to add an equestrian statue, install a pediment, modify the roof, and improve pedestrian flow around the memorial. In 1961, the NPS announced plans to spend $200,000 on an equestrian statue and repairs to the tomb. The NPS dropped plans for the pediment that year, but it did make some minor changes, such as the addition of new labels and a telephone, as well as replacement of display panels. Paul Manship, who had designed a model of a statue for the GMA three decades earlier, was hired to design the statue; amid strong opposition, the statue was canceled in 1962. Pitkin proposed installing colorful lunette murals within the memorial in 1962, and the NPS also installed floodlights to deter loitering. The memorial was documented in the Historic American Buildings Survey in 1963. Grant's Tomb continued to record 300,000 annual visitors during the mid-1960s, even as it was being vandalized frequently.

The GMA transferred $20,000 to the NPS in 1964 to help pay for the installation of two mosaic murals; the NPS also spent $10,000 on a third mural. The NPS hired Allyn Cox to design the murals. The GMA officially dissolved itself in April 1965, using its last $9,095.50 to buy a model of an equestrian statue by Manship, which was then displayed in the tomb. Cox's murals were dedicated in May 1966, and additional modifications took place throughout the decade. The tomb was added to the National Register of Historic Places in 1966, at which point annual patronage dropped to 120,000. The NPS also loosened restrictions within the memorial, allowing visitors to see the crypt and take pictures for the first time. In the late 1960s, the NPS painted over two of the WPA-era murals and replaced them with portraits; two other murals were revised to include portraits of African Americans. By the end of the decade, annual patronage had declined to 95,300.

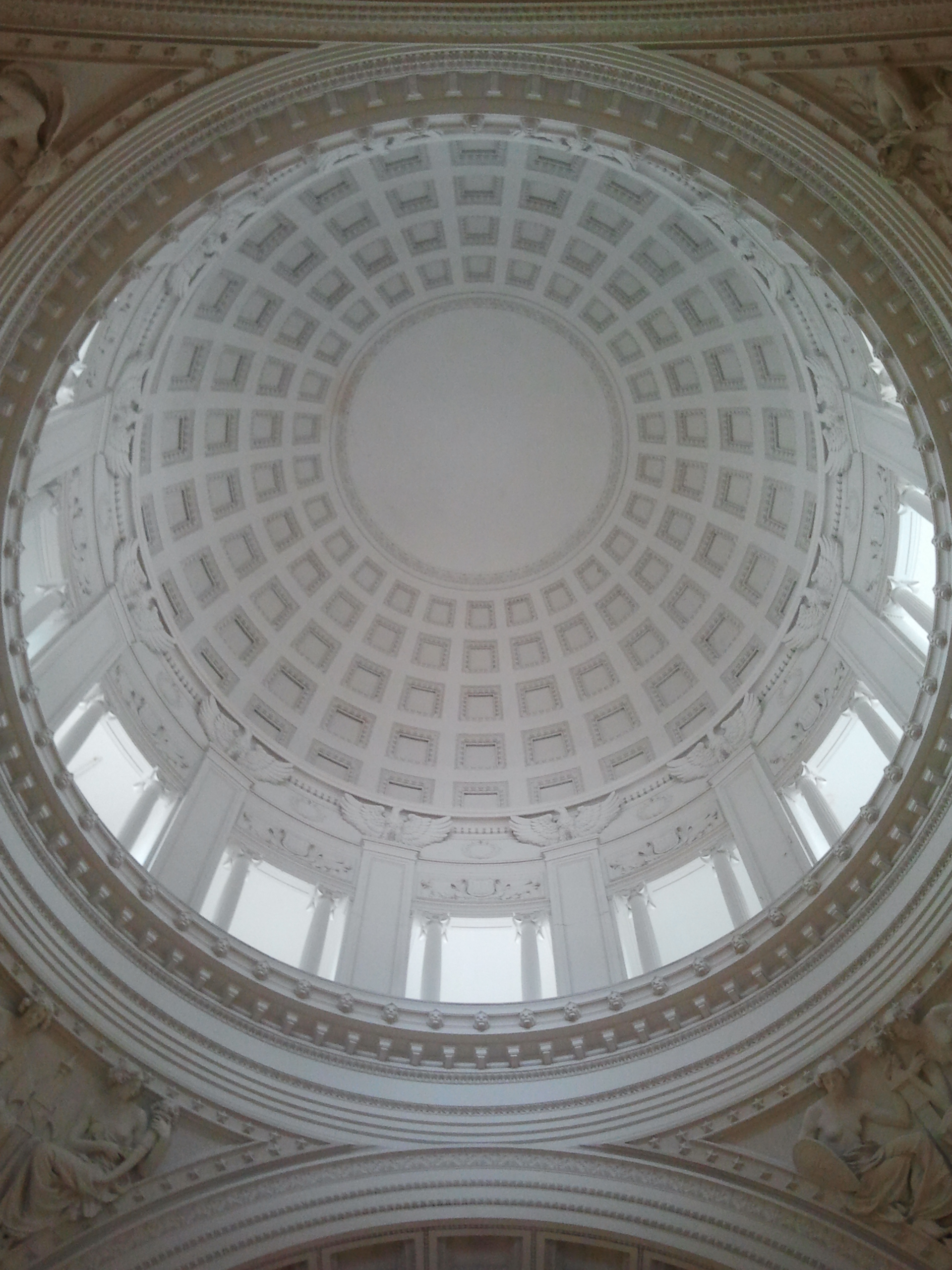
The dome was repainted in 1974.

In 1970, NPS workers demolished bronze cases that had displayed battle flags. The flags themselves, as well as some letters and other documents, were placed into storage; the documents were stored under a water heater, where they were damaged significantly. That year, more floodlights were added to the memorial. Beginning in 1972, the granite benches around the memorial were replaced with mosaic-tile benches designed by Pedro Silva. The benches were intended to discourage graffiti on the tomb, which by then cost $11,000 a year to remove. Initially budgeted at $20,000, the benches ended up costing $50,000 and took two years to complete. The NPS added fans and reinforced the steel frame of the roof from 1973 to early 1974. This was followed later the same year by a repainting of the dome and barrel vaults inside the monument, which required a two-month closure of Grant's Tomb in late 1974.

==== Late 1970s to early 1990s ====
By the 1970s, the tomb was vandalized and graffitied on a regular basis, and homeless persons, drug users, and muggers frequented the memorial. Local residents reported that the sculptures around the tomb were generally spared from graffiti, though there were calls to remove the sculptures, which had decreased by the 1980s. The New York City Landmarks Preservation Commission designated the mausoleum as a city landmark in 1975; the designation applied to both the facade and the interior. The visitor pavilion west of Grant's Tomb closed in the 1970s, and annual patronage bottomed out at just over 35,000 in 1979. Meanwhile, the NPS was largely unsuccessful in its attempts to prevent graffiti and other damage. Even when the tomb was repaired, it was often damaged again; for example, the eagle statues were damaged so frequently that the NPS procured several spare beaks to use as replacements. The NPS spent $50,000 to renovate the tomb from 1982 to 1984, at which point the tomb averaged 75,000 visitors per year. The NPS hired security guards to patrol the tomb, but vandals simply waited until the guards' shifts ended. The tomb's entire staff consisted of two janitors and one person handing out pamphlets, and there were no longer guided tours. The upper level was closed because of staff shortages.

Newspapers regularly reported on crimes at the tomb in the late 1980s and early 1990s, describing the monument as a frequent site for public urination and defecation, drug use, and muggings. Funding cuts forced the NPS to close the memorial on Sundays starting in 1986. There was no nighttime security in the early 1990s, and the memorial was open for only eight hours on Wednesdays through Sundays. The exhibits had become neglected, and the public had largely forgotten about the tomb itself: according to The Washington Post, many tourists did not know whose tomb it was. One rare photo of Grant was not replaced after being stolen, while another photo depicted the wrong person. Preservationists estimated in 1993 that the monument only had 40,000 annual visitors, even though the NPS claimed the memorial had 100,000 visitors per year.

The federal government gave the New York City Department of Parks and Recreation $300,000 for a restoration of the tomb's long-closed visitor pavilion in 1989. Meanwhile, the monument itself continued to fall into disrepair. NPS superintendent Georgette Nelms said the graffiti on the facade was deterring visitors and prompting concerned letters from around the world. The memorial also had leaks in its roof and cracks on its pillars. The interior had peeling paint, and the facade was being damaged by the chemical solution that was used to wipe away the graffiti. By contrast, Robert E. Lee's burial site at University Chapel was well-maintained and open seven days a week. The dilapidated conditions at Grant's Tomb also contrasted with the well-kept nature of Columbia University's campus a few blocks away, as well as nearby churches such as Riverside Church.

==== 1990s restoration ====
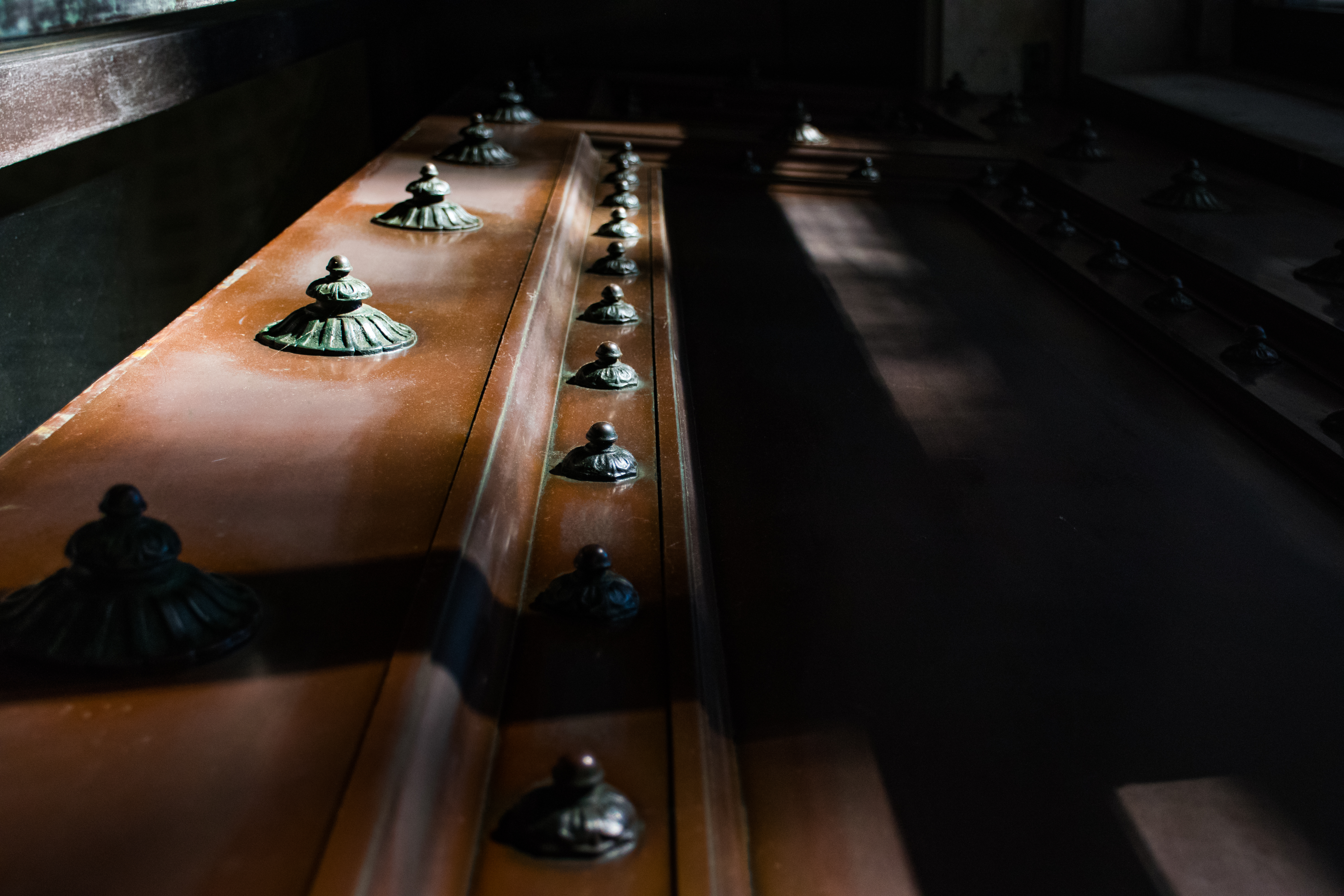
Grant's Tomb, interior detail

Frank Scaturro, a Columbia University student, launched an effort to restore the tomb after he became a volunteer park ranger in 1991. Scaturro recalled that homeless people and drug users still congregated around the tomb and that it was common to smell human waste and drugs there. Early the next year, the NPS proposed several options for improving the exhibits in Grant's Tomb. Scaturro sent weekly memos to the NPS for over two years, to no avail. He published a 325-page whistleblower report in 1993 and sent it to news media, as well as government officials including U.S. president Bill Clinton and members of Congress. After WNBC aired a report on the tomb's condition in November 1993, the NPS fired Scaturro, who said "whistle-blowing was the last resort". Grant's descendants called Scaturro a hero for his advocacy. That year, George M. Craig formed a group known as the Friends of Grant's Tomb to advocate for the memorial's restoration; the group could not raise the requisite $11.5 million. By the end of 1993, the NPS's Manhattan office was considering numerous options to restore the monument. Scaturro spent $2,000 of his own money to improve the tomb's condition and reestablished the Grant Monument Association, which was not involved in the tomb's operation.

The bad condition of the tomb had prompted several proposals to relocate the Grants' remains. The Illinois General Assembly approved a resolution by lawmaker Judy Baar Topinka in March 1994, asking the NPS to either restore Grant's Tomb or move the remains to Illinois. Scaturro and one of Grant's descendants, Ulysses Grant Deitz, sued the NPS the next month, claiming the agency had left the structure to rot. A bill to relocate the Grants' remains was also introduced in the U.S. House of Representatives, and politicians from Grant's birth state of Ohio wanted the remains relocated there. The NPS subsequently requested $850,000 in federal funds to renovate the tomb. At the time, the agency was working on a long-term plan for Grant's Tomb and needed $250,000 per year for security. The same year, the U.S. House of Representatives introduced legislation to restore the tomb before its centennial. This plan provided up to $375,000 for the memorial's renovation, which Scaturro and Deitz criticized as insufficient. Deitz still threatened to move Ulysses and Julia Grant's remains elsewhere unless the memorial was fully restored before 1997. Ultimately, $1.8 million was provided for the tomb's renovation.

The exterior was renovated first, followed by the interior. The NPS used an abrasive and chemicals to clean the facade, and it replaced the leaking roof. In addition, new displays and mechanical systems were added, and the NPS spent $80,000 to restore one of Fausett's two murals. Bronze trophy cases were placed in the memorial to replace older cases that had been destroyed. During the restoration, the NPS attempted to disassemble The Rolling Bench; this prompted protests, so the NPS ultimately kept the benches. The facade and roof modifications had been completed by 1995, and the NPS had hired additional guards to patrol the memorial 24 hours a day. The tomb was rededicated on April 27, 1997, its 100th anniversary and Grant's 175th birthday, with a parade and a two-day-long celebration attended by 1,300 people.

==== Post-renovation and 21st century ====
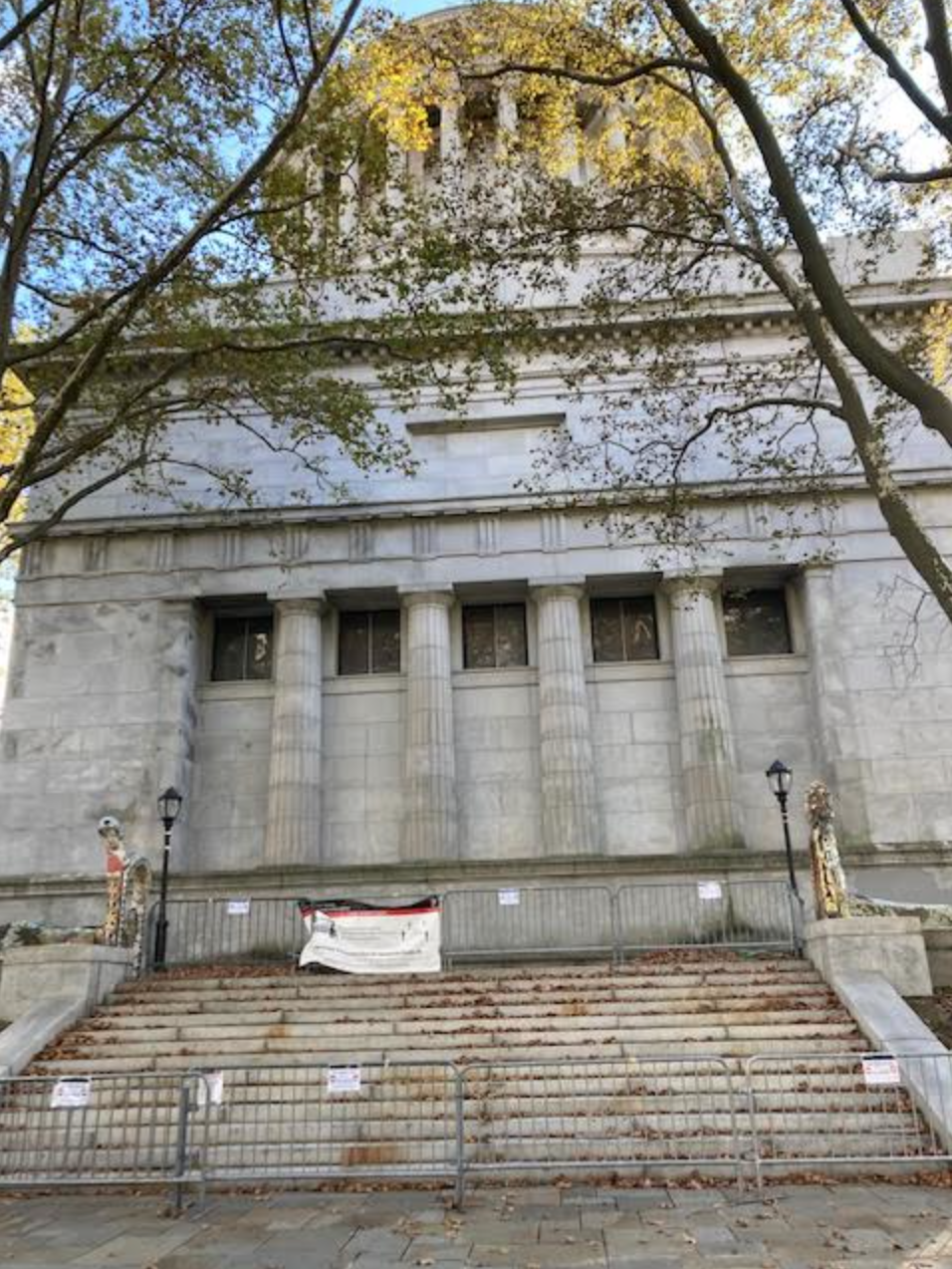
The back side of Grant's Tomb in October 2021, closed to the public

The renovated Grant's Tomb recorded 126,432 visitors in 1997, a 32-year high, and the memorial also recorded over 100,000 annual visitors during the next two years. Although the Grants' descendants were satisfied with the renovation, Topinka continued to advocate for the relocation of the Grants' remains. During the early 21st century, the memorial continued to record about 100,000 annual visitors, or fewer than 300 per day. Many of the visitors were American Civil War enthusiasts. The New York City government gave the NPS an easement in 2004, allowing the agency to restore the visitor center west of Riverside Drive, and the visitor center reopened on April 27, 2011. By then, the tomb recorded 120,000 annual visitors.

Parts of the memorial had again begun to fall into disrepair by the late 2010s, with such issues as peeling paint, cracks, rusted flagpoles, and water damage. AM New York Metro reported in 2018 that the memorial needed $777,355 for repainting and for repairs to the stairs and pathways. Although U.S. senator Chuck Schumer had pledged money to restore the memorial in 2019, it still saw occasional vandalism, such as during the early 2019 federal government shutdown when the memorial was vandalized. Scaturro, who by then was the president of the Grant Monument Association, advocated for federal and city officials to add security and refurbish the memorial. Due to staffing shortages, the memorial had to close on Mondays and Tuesdays; even on days when Grant's Tomb was open, visitors were only allowed into the memorial on alternating hours. Scaturro also wanted the city and federal governments to help fund the addition of a finial atop the tomb.

== Description ==
The design of Grant's Tomb was inspired by ancient Greek and Roman structures, in particular the Pantheon, Rome. Duncan may have taken some elements of his design, such as dimensions, from his onetime classmate Henry O. Avery, who created a drawing for the monument in 1885. This has not been substantiated, as Avery died in 1890 before construction started. The Ionic colonnade of the upper section may have been inspired by a design created by an architect named Bernier, although Bernier's blueprints were not published until 1892 at the earliest.

=== Site ===
Grant's Tomb is in the median of Riverside Drive at 122nd Street in the Morningside Heights neighborhood of Manhattan in New York City. It occupies a high bluff, standing 130 ft (40 m) above mean high water. The northbound lanes of Riverside Drive abut the memorial to the east, while the southbound lanes are to the west. The area near the memorial is served by the M5, M4, and M104 routes of MTA Regional Bus Operations, while the 1 train of the New York City Subway stops at 125th Street and Broadway. The mausoleum is not wheelchair-accessible. It is generally open Wednesday through Sunday, year-round, although the tomb is closed on Thanksgiving, Christmas, and New Year's Day.

A granite plaza, dating from the late 1930s, surrounds the tomb. Two flagpoles with brass plaques were erected within the plaza during the 1930s. The western flagpole commemorates Frederick Dent Grant—the first son of Ulysses and Julia Grant—and contains an American flag. The eastern flagpole commemorates Horace Porter and contains Grant's four-star general's flag. There is also a grove of trees, which was not part of the original design for the memorial's grounds. The area north of Grant's Tomb has several ginkgo trees, as well as a Chinese cork, which date from Li Hongzhang's visit to the United States in 1897. There is also a commemorative tablet from Li's visit.

A visitor center or pavilion is located across Riverside Drive to the west of the mausoleum and contains a bookstore, a community space, and restrooms. This pavilion displays memorabilia and a movie about Grant's life. The visitor center, dating from 1910, is a classical-style pavilion designed by Theodore E. Videto. The structure is made of granite and supported by Doric columns, with restrooms on a lower level. The visitor center is wheelchair-accessible.

==== Art and other memorials ====
According to NYC Parks, "some popular local folk art in Riverside Park contrasts strikingly with the Tomb's severity". Among these is The Rolling Bench, a sculpture consisting of 17 concrete benches bearing colorful mosaics. Completed in 1972, it was designed by artist Pedro Silva and built with help from local residents. The benches depict various scenes, animals, people, objects, and fictional characters in addition to Grant himself. The project was sponsored by the nonprofit organization CITYarts. The sculpture was restored during mid-2008 under Silva's supervision.

There are two other memorials in the vicinity of Grant's Tomb. The General Horace Porter memorial, at 122nd Street, is a flagpole on a pedestal dedicated in 1939. Another flagpole on a pedestal, Major General Frederick D. Grant, was also dedicated at 122nd Street in 1939.

=== Form and facade ===
The structure is 150 feet (46 m) tall. The design uses minimal glass to give the impression that the monument "would last through the ages". The total height was downsized from 160 feet (49 m) to save money. Until Riverside Church to the southeast was completed in 1930, Grant's Tomb was the area's tallest structure.

The exterior is made of North Jay, Maine, granite. The facade is modeled after the Mausoleum at Halicarnassus, with some differences, including the design of the roofline. The base of the tomb is shaped almost like a cube (actually a rectangular prism), measuring 72 feet (22 m) high. The base measures 90 by 90 feet (27 by 27 m); it was originally intended to be 100 by 100 feet (30 by 30 m) but was downsized to save money. Although the upper section of Grant's Tomb is cylindrical, in contrast to the square Mausoleum at Halicarnassus, both structures had a similarly proportioned base and peristyle. Due to the tomb's design, early visitors mistook it for a bank, house of worship, library, post office, or mansion, while later visitors confused it with the Soldiers' and Sailors' Monument to the south.

==== Base ====
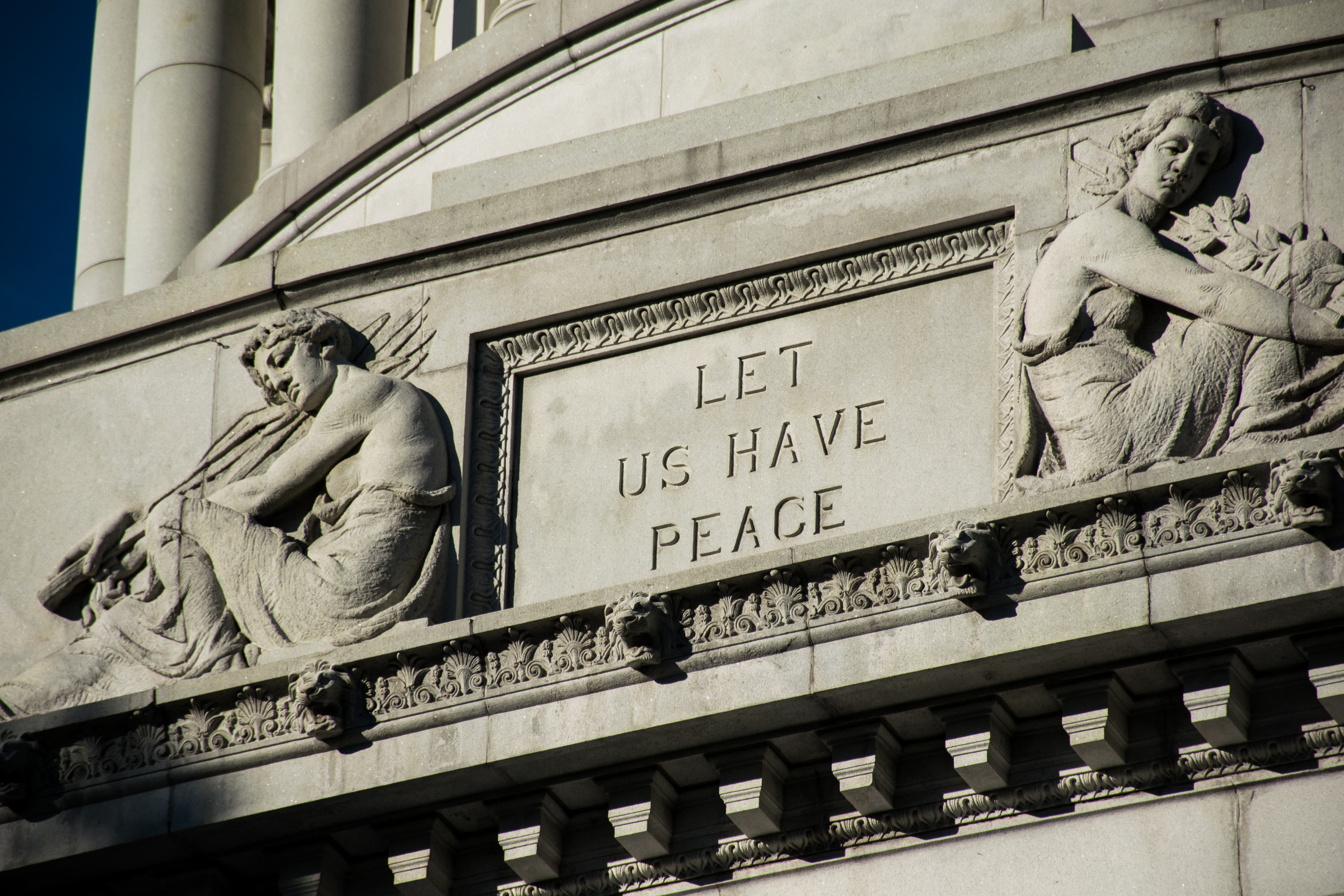
Detail of plaque above the entrance

The main entrance is through a 70-foot (21 m)-wide set of stairs facing a plaza to the south, which leads to a hexastyle portico with fluted columns in the Doric order. The portico is supported by ten columns, which are grouped into two rows. There are six columns at the front of the portico. Atop the columns is a Doric entablature with wreaths and circular bosses, as well as stone blocks above each column on the portico's cornice. Early plans for Grant's Tomb called for the installation of equestrian statues, depicting generals who led the Union Army, on each stone block. The wooden entrance doors, made by Borkelt & Debevoise, measure 4 feet (1.2 m) wide by 16 feet (4.9 m) tall and weigh 7,000 pounds (3,200 kg) in total. The doors are covered with 296 rosettes, which conceal parchment papers with dozens of New Yorkers' signatures.

Behind the portico is the memorial's rectangular base. There is a cornice and a sloped parapet running around the perimeter of the rectangular base. At the center of the base's southern elevation, above the portico, is a plaque with the inscription "Let us have peace", referring to Grant's acceptance statement after the Republican Party nominated him as its candidate for the 1868 United States presidential election. On either side of the plaque are female figures, which may have been derived from those on the Medici Tomb; these were designed by J. Massey Rhind and represent peace and victory. The western, northern, and eastern elevations have colonnades of Doric columns supporting an entablature, with six columns on each elevation. In contrast to the southern elevation, the other three elevations have small square openings between each column, and the parapet above each colonnade is flat. There is a fret molding below the northern elevation's colonnade. A similar fret molding on the western and eastern elevations was scrapped for lack of money.

==== Upper section ====
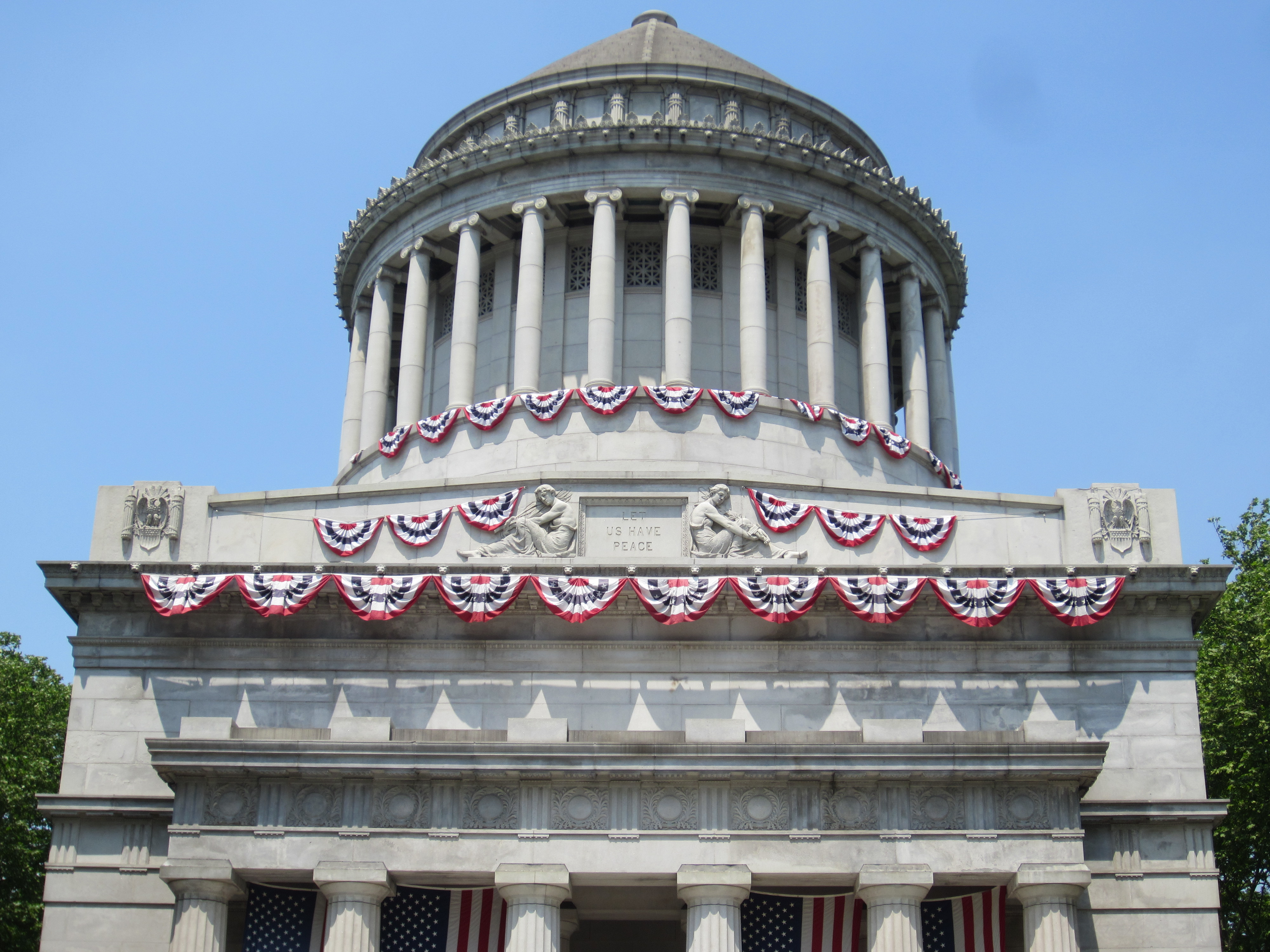
Upper portion of Grant's Tomb

The memorial's upper section contains a cylindrical drum with an Ionic colonnade, which measures about 70 feet (21 m) across. Behind the colonnade is an inner wall that rises to the monument's roof. The columns support an entablature, as well as a cornice with palmettes and bosses. Above the cornice, there are pilasters and panels on the inner wall of the colonnade. There is a stepped cone above the inner wall, with a capstone weighing 5 short tons (4.5 long tons; 4.5 t). When Duncan designed Grant's Tomb, he had intended for the cone's shape to evoke that of the Egyptian pyramids, where Egyptian monarchs were buried. Early plans for the monument called for a statue of Grant to be placed atop the cone, although it was not built. There is also an observation deck about 130 feet (40 m) above ground.

=== Interior ===
The interior has a cruciform layout, with arms extending off all four sides of a rectangular space. It is clad with white marble from Lee, Massachusetts. The maximum distance from arm to arm is 76 feet (23 m). The design was strongly inspired by the interior of Napoleon's tomb at Les Invalides, Paris. Rhind was responsible for the original interior decorations. The entire tomb rests on a foundation measuring 20 feet (6.1 m) deep.

==== Main level ====
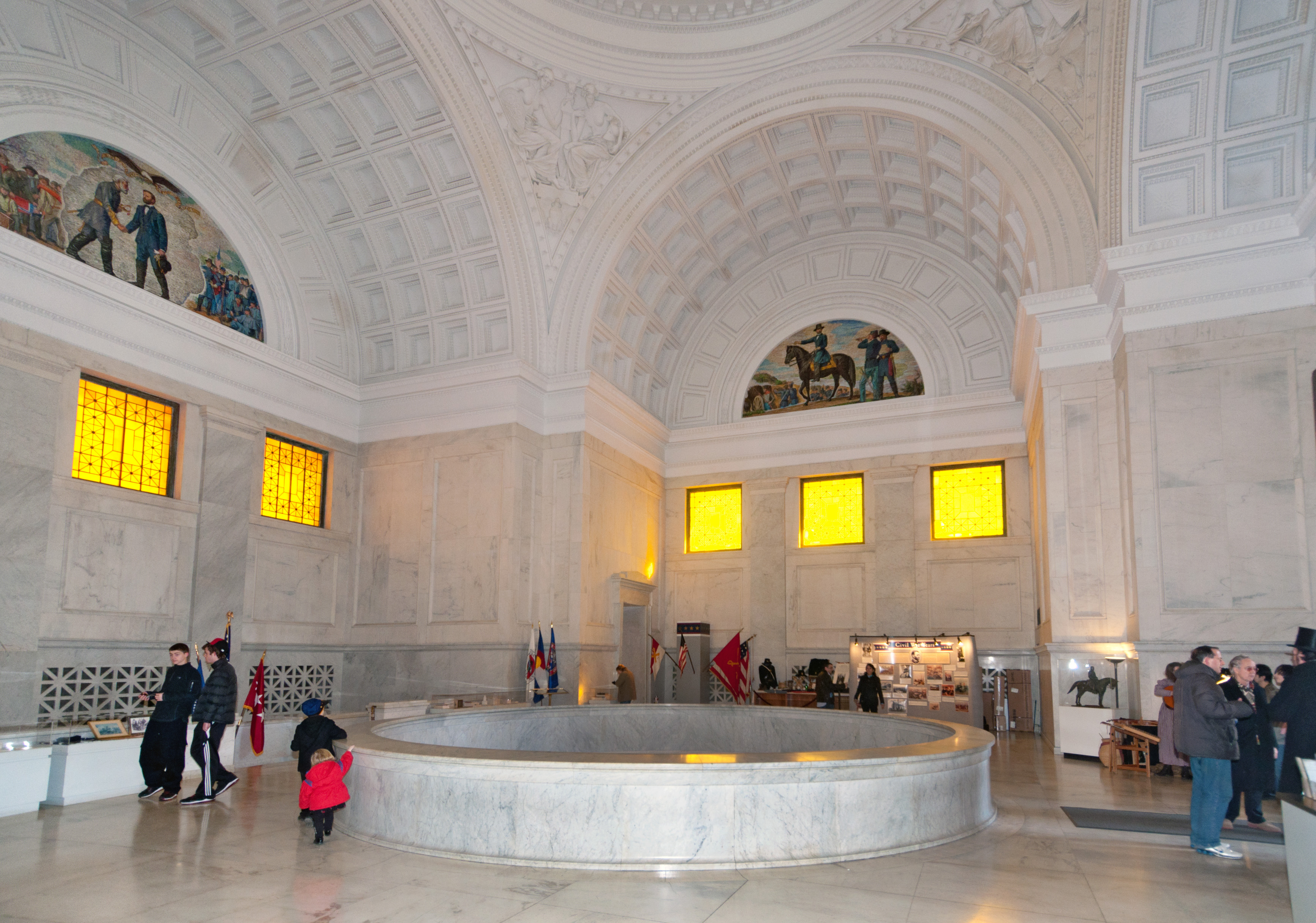
Interior of the main level

The center of the memorial's main room is topped by a circular dome with coffers. The dome measures 40 feet (12 m) across and is surrounded by a balcony or gallery. The gallery contains 12 openings, separated by pilasters with eagle sculptures at their capitals. Each opening contains a pair of Ionic columns, topped by pairs of panels with wreaths and shields. There were originally supposed to be 13 openings to represent the Thirteen Colonies, with seals in each opening. At each corner of the room, the dome is supported by piers measuring 50 feet (15 m) high. Above these piers are pendentives depicting various eras of Grant's life, which include allegorical figures sculpted by Rhind. The southeast pendentive represents Grant's birth; the southwest pendentive depicts his time in the military; the northwest pendentive symbolizes his time as a politician and statesman; and the northeast pendentive signifies his death.

There are barrel vaults with coffered panels above each of the arms; these vaults measure 50 feet (15 m) high. The western, northern, and eastern arms each have three square windows with amber-colored glass, which date to a 1930s renovation. The southern arm contains a pair of bronze doors. The lunettes above the windows, and below the barrel vaults, feature mosaics designed in 1966 by Allyn Cox. These mosaic murals measure 9 feet (2.7 m) high by 18 feet (5.5 m) across. The battles of Chattanooga, Appomattox, and Vicksburg are depicted in the murals on the western, northern, and eastern walls respectively.

Mosaic murals

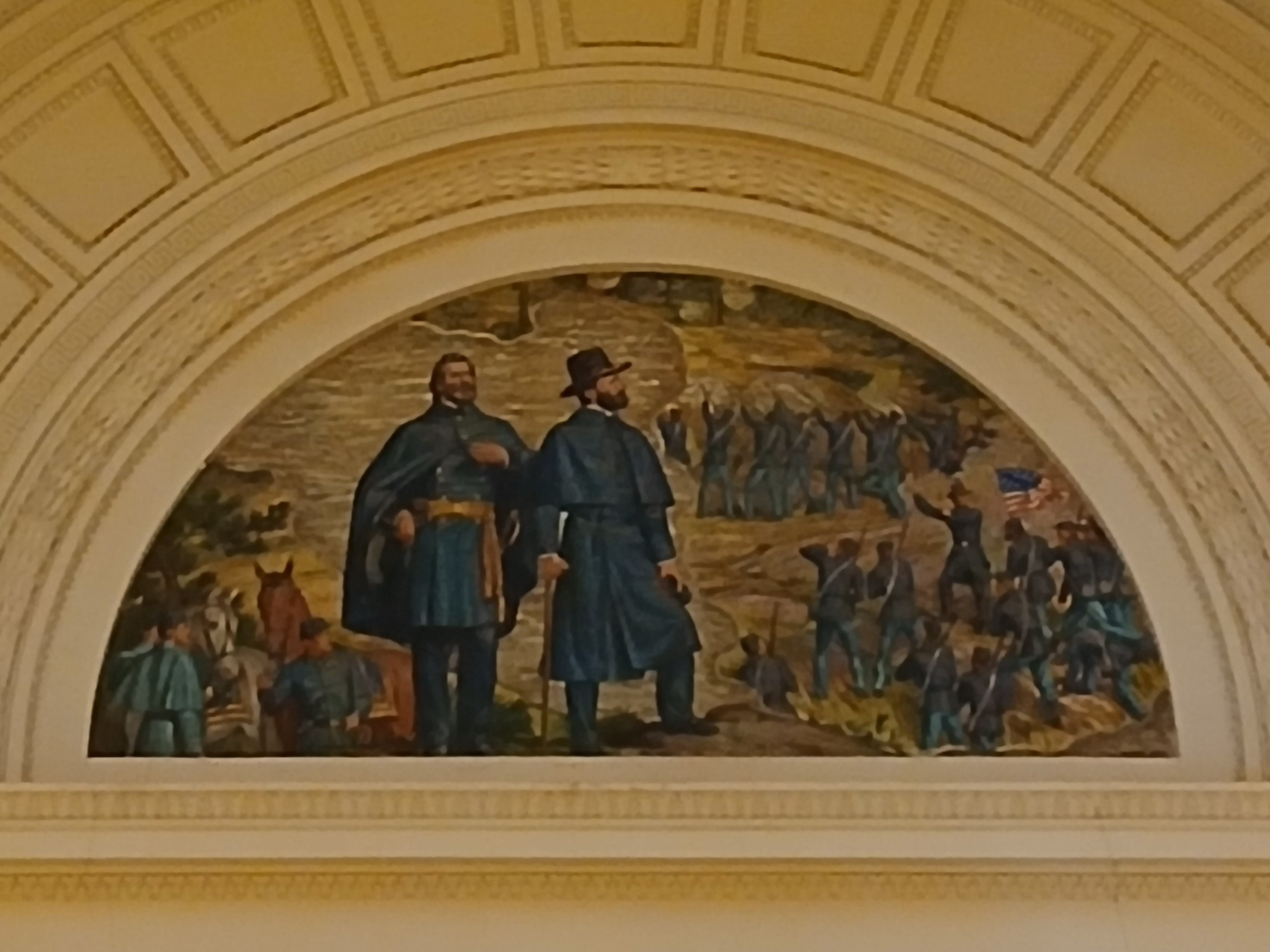
Chattanooga (west wall)

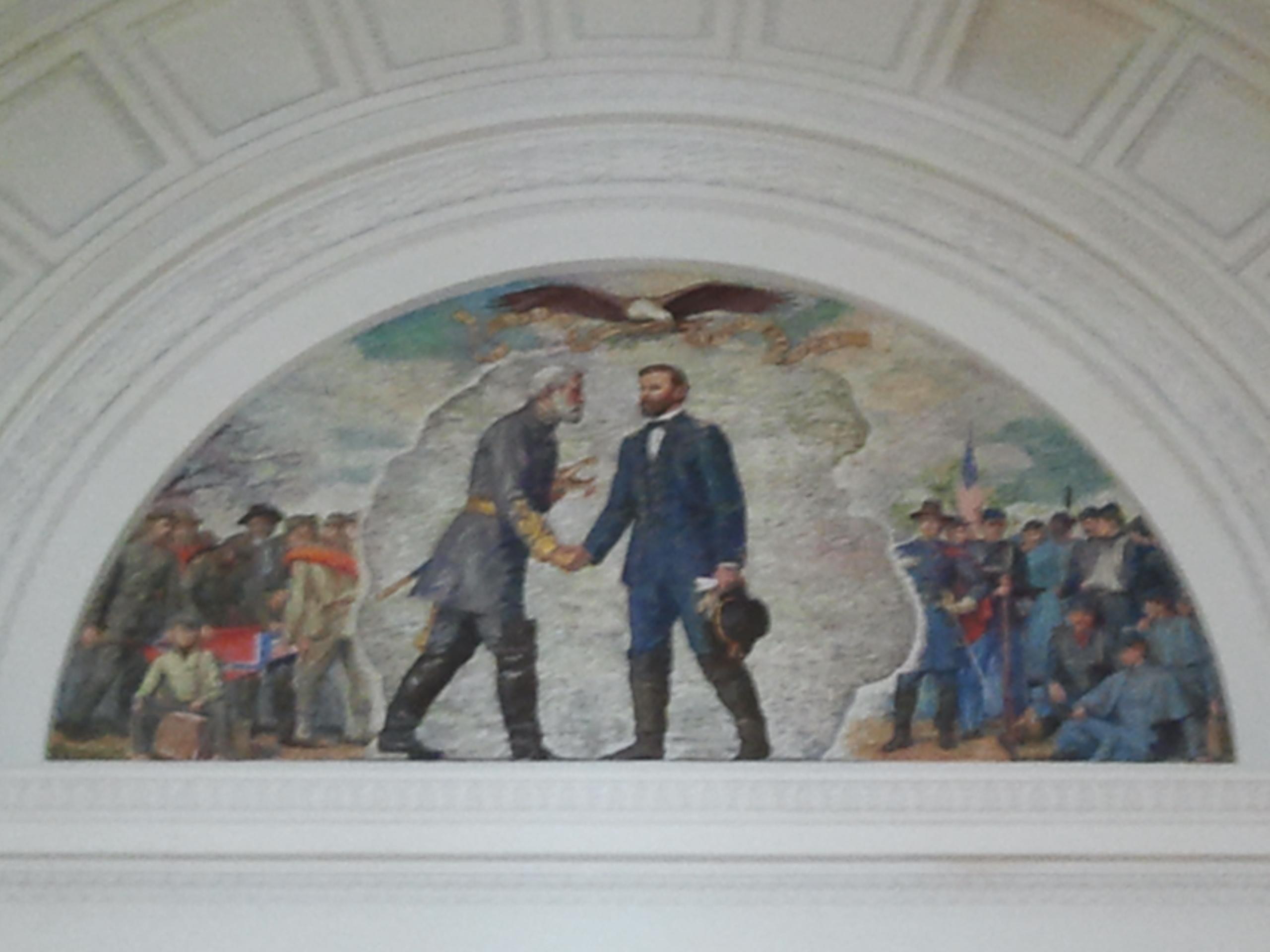
Appomattox (north wall)

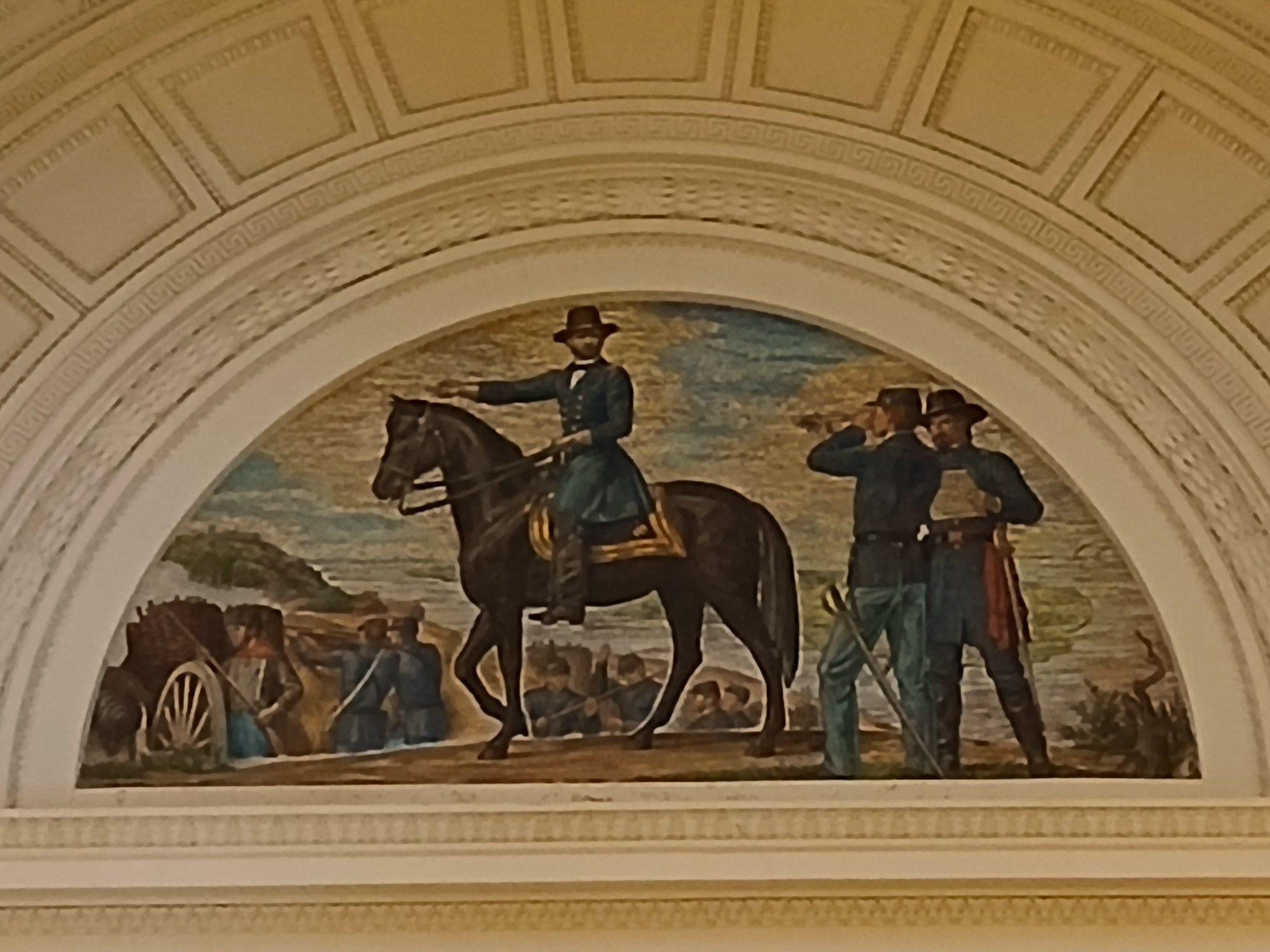
Vicksburg (east wall)

At the southwestern and southeastern corners of the main room are spiral staircases under quarter-domed skylights, which lead to the gallery. Before the tomb opened, Duncan decided not to open the gallery to the public. There are circular reliquary rooms with false domes to the northwest and northeast of the main room. The reliquary rooms contained murals by Dean Fausett, which each measured 11.5 by 38.5 feet (3.5 by 11.7 m) and depicted maps of Civil War battle sites. The northwestern room's mural depicted battles between Pennsylvania and North Carolina, while the northeastern room's mural depicted battles between North Carolina and Florida. The murals were painted over in the 1960s, but one mural was restored in the 1990s. By the 1990s, there were exhibits about the monument's construction, the Black community of Upper Manhattan, and the lifetime of Ulysses S. Grant.

==== Crypt ====
The northern arm contains a double staircase descending to the crypt, which is at ground level. Ulysses and Julia Grant are placed in identical separate 8.5-short-ton (7.6-long-ton; 7.7 t) red-granite sarcophagi placed side by side beneath the center of the dome. The granite was quarried by the Berlin and Montello Granite Company of Wisconsin and was selected for its visual similarity to the material used in Napoleon's tomb. Each sarcophagus measures 10.33 by 5.5 by 4.67 feet (3 by 2 by 1 m) across. Under both sarcophagi is a single gray-blue granite pedestal measuring 7.5 feet (2.3 m) high and 10.8 by 10.8 feet (3.3 by 3.3 m) across. A plaque with the name of each Grant is placed on either sarcophagus. (Note: A plan to inscribe the death dates of each Grant on the sides of the sarcophagi was canceled.) A balustrade separates the sarcophagi from a corridor that wraps around the crypt.

The outer wall of the crypt is divided by square piers, which support an entablature and a ceiling with paneling. On the wall are five niches with busts depicting Union generals in the Civil War. The busts depict William T. Sherman, Phillip H. Sheridan, George H. Thomas, James B. McPherson, and Edward Ord. William Mues designed the busts of Sheridan and Sherman, while Jens Juszko designed the other three.

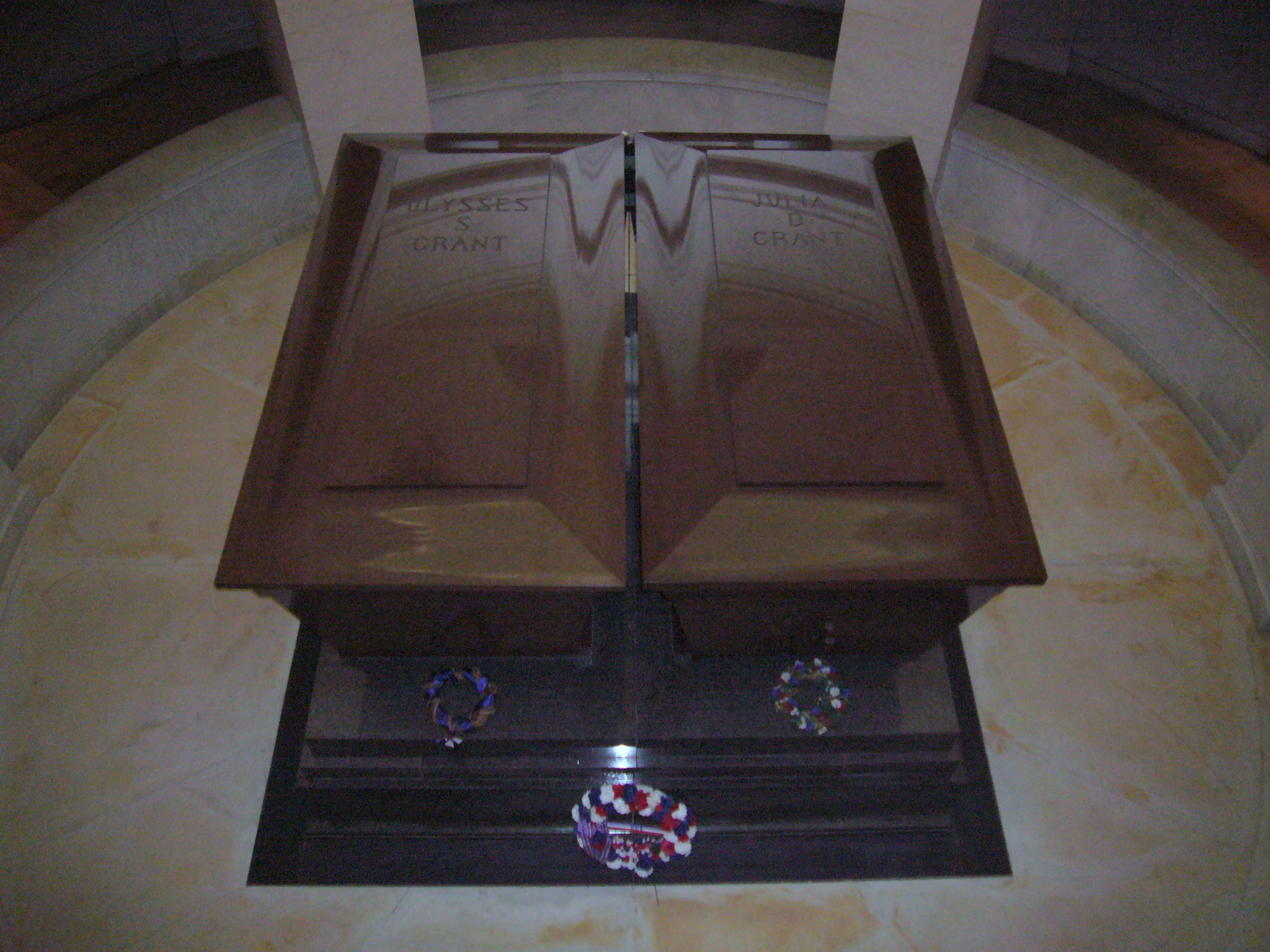
Red granite sarcophagi of Ulysses and Julia Grant

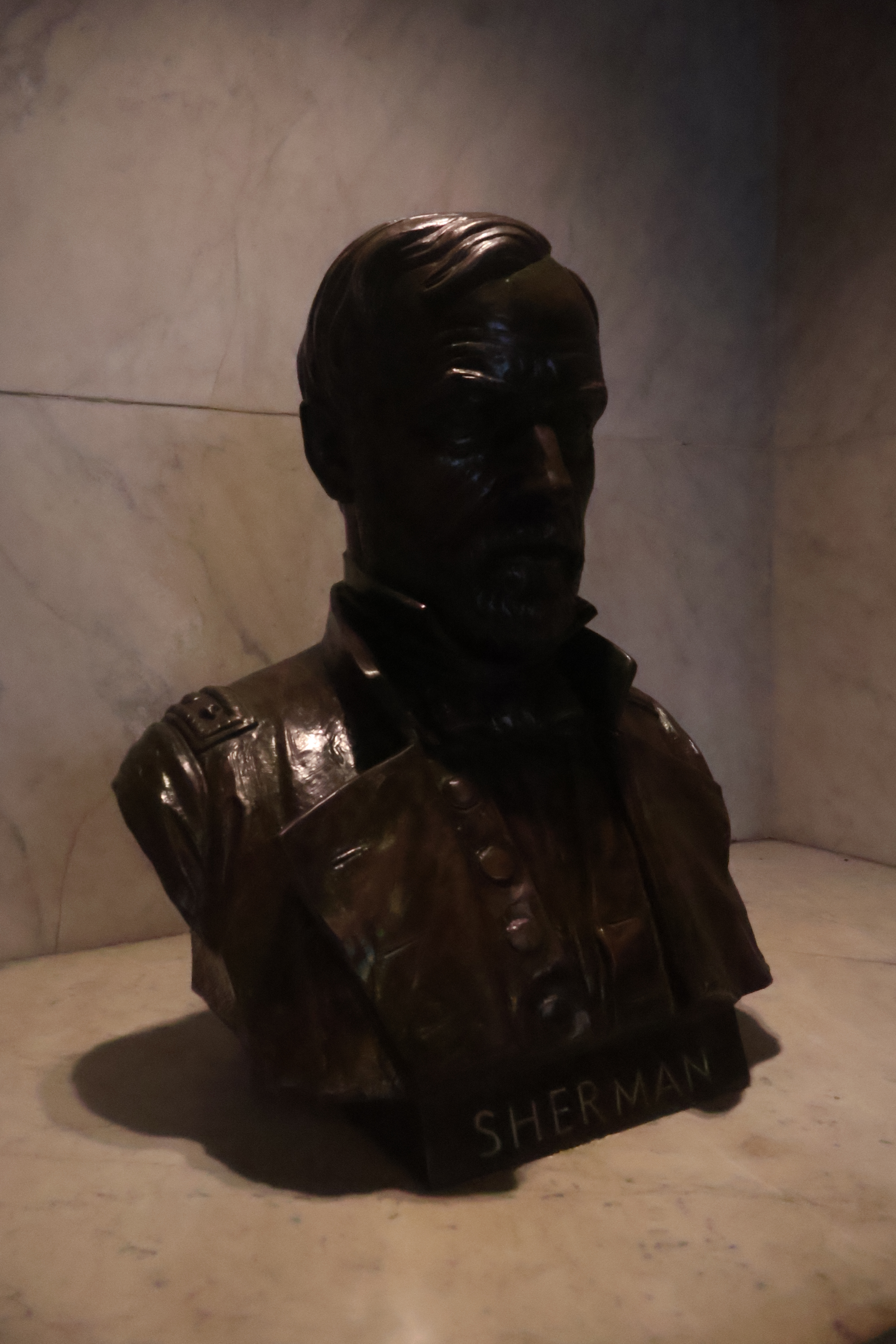
Bust of William Tecumseh Sherman in Grant's Tomb

== Activities ==
Jazz concerts have been hosted outside the tomb since at least 1975. Since then, concerts have regularly been held at or just outside Grant's Tomb. Examples include Jazzmobile, Inc.'s annual Free Outdoor Summer Mobile Concerts at Grant's Tomb. The annual Grant's Tomb Summer Concert also featured West Point's United States Military Academy Band in 2009. A ceremony is held at the memorial every year on April 27, Grant's birthday.

Starting in the late 20th century, "Harlem Week" events took place outside Grant's Tomb. According to About...Time magazine, "While many African Americans may never have visited the lesser-known sites, everybody in the New York City area knows Grant's Tomb" because of Harlem Week. During the late 20th and 21st centuries, television station WNBC-TV also hosted Independence Day television specials featuring Grant's Tomb in the background. These specials have showcased performers such as Bon Jovi and Beyoncé. Other events at the tomb have included a spring picnic hosted by Bette Midler's New York Restoration Project.

== Impact ==
=== Critical reception ===
==== Contemporary commentary ====
When the design for Grant's Tomb was announced in 1890, The New York Times wrote that "disinterested and competent observers must agree that the choice was well made", while the Brooklyn Citizen called the design "worthy of the man and a credit to the great metropolis". Architectural critic Montgomery Schuyler described the design as "by far the best" of the five submitted in the second design competition. Duncan received several architectural awards in the years after he received the commission. The New York Herald wrote in 1895: "It is a comparatively easy task to construct a mere tomb or monument, but a very great difficulty is presented in a monumental tomb, and the task has been successfully accomplished."

David Kahn wrote that, after Grant's Tomb opened, the site "was praised as being superior to that of Napoleon's, Hadrian's or Theoderic's mausoleums". One newspaper called the structure "our one great memorial of the struggle for union", while another described it as "remarkably white and marble-like in appearance". Park and Cemetery magazine wrote in May 1897 that Grant's Tomb was "an appropriate memorial to a man worthy of a nation's tribute". During the 1900s, the design of Grant's Tomb inspired that of the McKinley National Memorial in Ohio.

Not all reception was positive: local newspapers variously referred to the design as "cheap", "flimsy", "squat", "ugly", "clumsy", "heavy", and "awkward". A critic for the Cincinnati Enquirer wrote in 1896 that the monument "is hardly harmonious height. A cenotaph stands rather irrelevantly upon a temple ... The profile lines are stiff, and the feeling is not flowing ..." After the tomb opened, one magazine praised the interior and called the facade "imposing, well proportioned and dignified", but it labeled the western and eastern elevations as "lacking in interest" and described the tomb's two sections as being out of scale with each other. The Builder magazine similarly took issue with the scale of the exterior, and it described the "motif of the interior" as plainer than that of Les Invalides, but still wrote that "it is entitled to rank among the most notable monuments in America". One editorial in the Times in 1910 dubbed the structure a "mausoleum monstrosity".

==== Later commentary ====
After the benches around Grant's Tomb were added in 1974, they were controversial. Ulysses Grant's great-granddaughter Edith Grant Griffiths, who said "they certainly clash with that severe and dignified building", while the Ulysses S. Grant Association's president compared the benches to having a roller coaster outside the Lincoln Memorial. Conversely, architecture critic Paul Goldberger praised the benches as "perhaps Manhattan's finest piece of folk art of our time", and the AIA compared the benches to the buildings designed by Antoni Gaudí in Barcelona.

Of the monument itself, the WPA Guide to New York City wrote in 1939: "The high conical roof slopes downward to a circular colonnade atop the cube of the main hall; the difficult problem of uniting the three forms harmoniously remains unsolved." Former city parks commissioner August Heckscher II wrote in 1977 that the tomb was "among the comparatively few structures in the city that are absolutely safe" and that "one feels that the city is better for these evocations of a patriotic spirit so at odds with modernity". In 1980, Goldberger called the monument "more pompous than graceful, but it is imposing, particularly from within..." Robert A. M. Stern and the co-authors of his 1983 book New York 1900 said Duncan's design "embodied not so much the character of Grant, a character who outlived his reputation, but to create an American Valhalla, a shrine to American power".

The 2010 edition of the AIA Guide to New York City described the tomb as a "pompous sepulcher" and the benches "a populist huzzah for the solemn Grants". The same year, an author for The Record of New Jersey wrote that "chances are you can't think of anyone—not even your rich Uncle Midas—who has a final resting place grander than Ulysses S. Grant's". Ralph Gardner Jr. of The Wall Street Journal wrote in 2015: "The tomb, designed by John Duncan and based on an ancient Greek mausoleum, is relatively stark without being uninviting."

=== Media ===
The author Louis Picone wrote that, after Grant's Tomb was completed, it was "one of the most recognizable structures in America". In its early years, the memorial was featured in many commemorative postcards, as well as the short films Personal (1904) and How a French Nobleman Got a Wife Through the New York Herald Personal Columns (1904). In the mid-20th century, Grant's Tomb continued to be mentioned in such media works as Mr. Deeds Goes to Town (1936). As Grant's Tomb declined physically at the end of the century, it was also shown in movies such as the 1991 crime thriller New Jack City. During the 21st century, Grant's Tomb was also featured in shows such as Pan Am, where it stood in for a location in Paris.

When the comedian Groucho Marx's quiz show You Bet Your Life aired from 1950 to 1959, he often asked contestants, "Who was buried in Grant's Tomb?" The correct answer is "no one"; since neither of the Grants' sarcophagi is underground, nobody is buried in Grant's Tomb. Marx accepted the answer "Grant" and awarded a consolation prize to those who gave it. The riddle dates to at least the 1930s.

== See also ==
- Bibliography of Ulysses S. Grant
- List of national memorials of the United States
- List of burial places of presidents and vice presidents of the United States
- List of New York City Designated Landmarks in Manhattan above 110th Street
- National Register of Historic Places listings in Manhattan above 110th Street
- Presidential memorials in the United States
