= How a French Nobleman Got a Wife Through the New York Herald Personal Columns =

1904 film by Edwin S. Porter

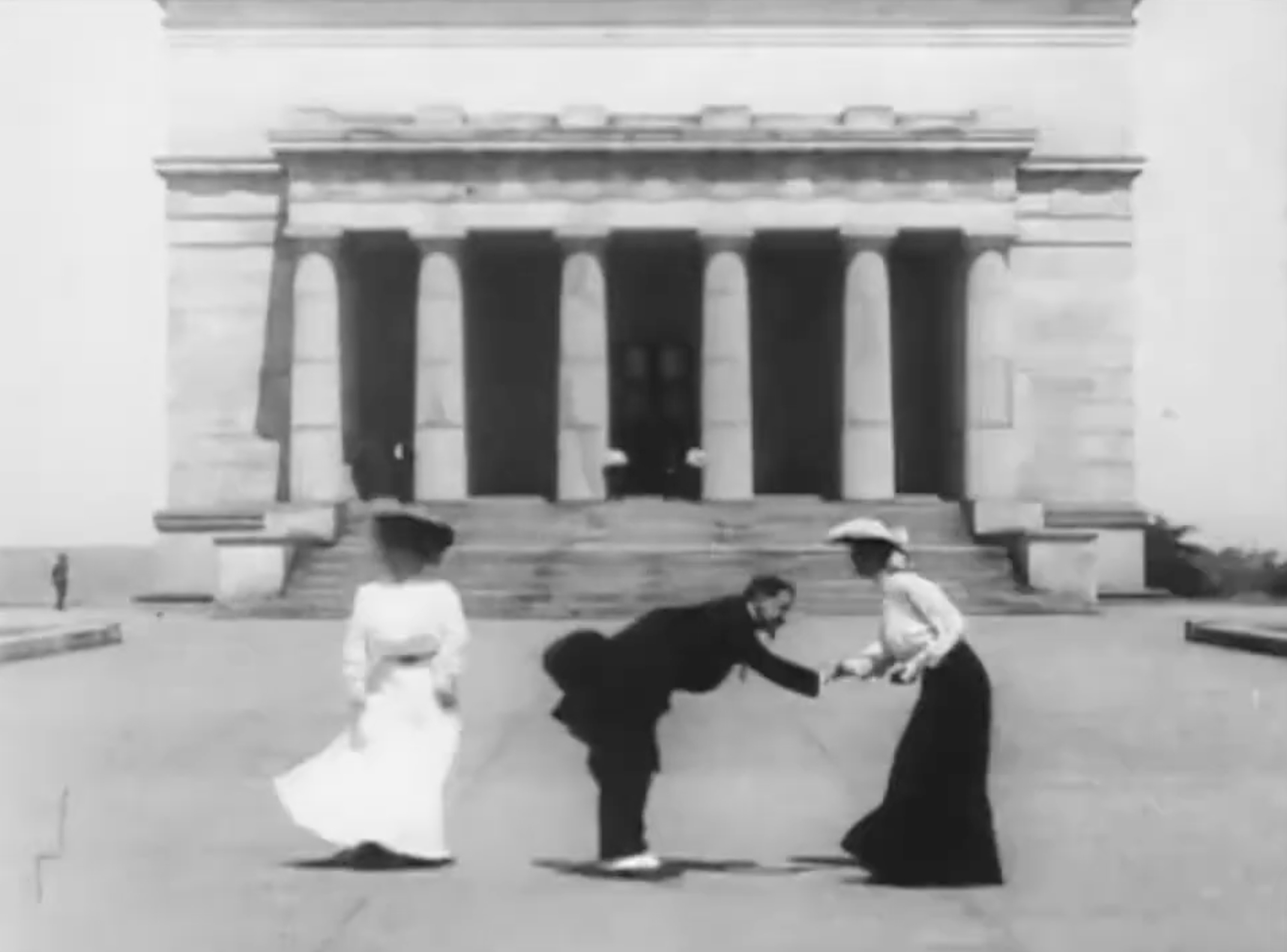
- Directed by: Edwin S. Porter
- Distributed by: Edison Manufacturing Company
- Release date: August 26, 1904
- Running time: 7:37
- Country: United States
- Language: Silent/English

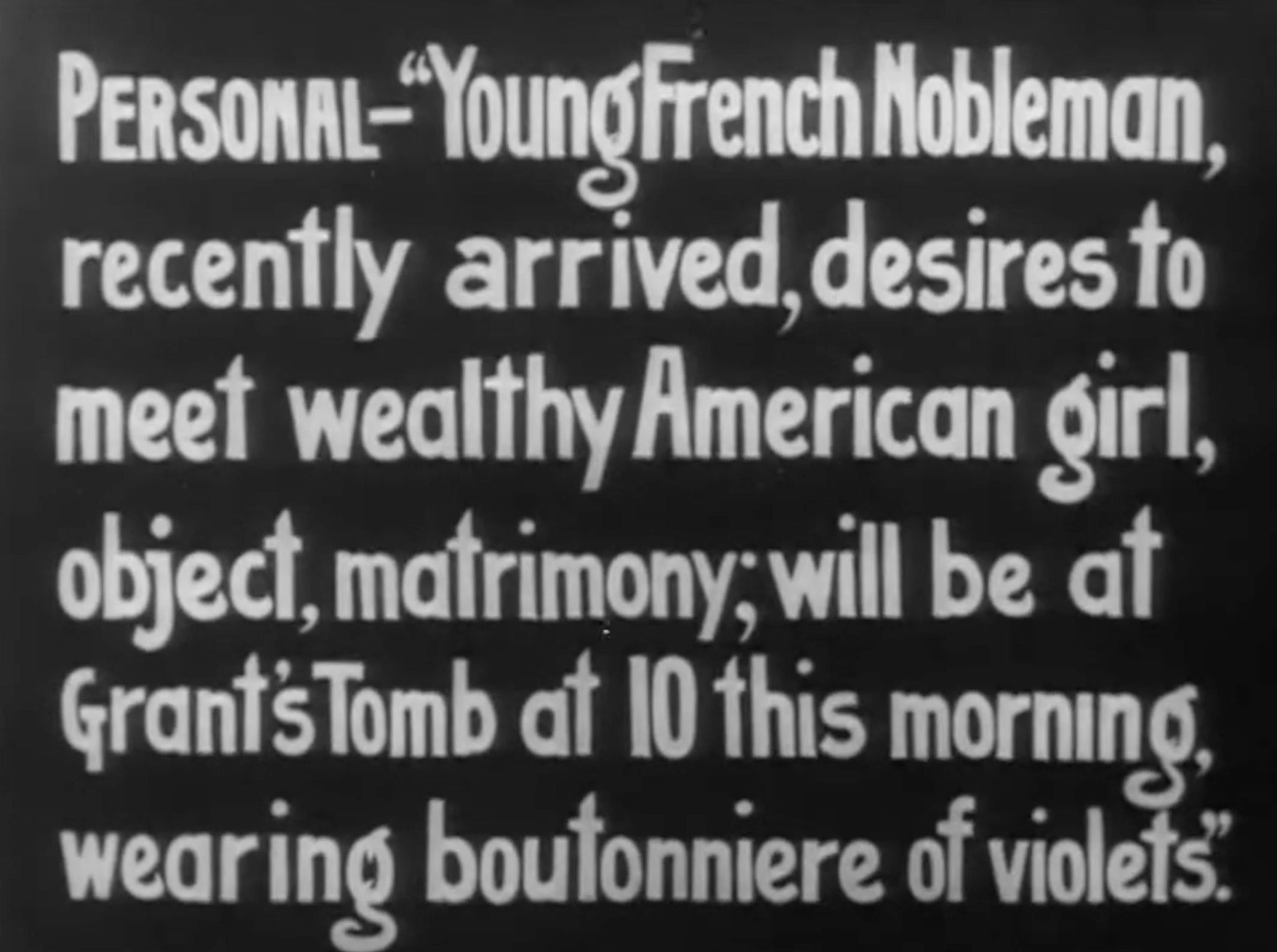
Personal ad presented in the film

How a French Nobleman Got a Wife Through the New York Herald Personal Columns is a 1904 silent comic film directed by Edwin S. Porter for the Edison Manufacturing Company. The film is a remake of the hit film Personal, produced by the Biograph Company earlier in the year. The film is a spoof of the "fashionable marriages" known to take place between cash-strapped European nobility and American heiresses.

Biograph sued the Edison Company for copyright infringement, but Edison prevailed because Biograph had only copyrighted the film as a series of photographs, and not as a dramatic production. The case prompted Biograph to change both its copyright practice and its distribution strategy.

== Plot ==
A title presents an ad placed in the personals column of the New York Herald: "Young French Nobleman, recently arrived, desires to meet wealthy American girl; object, matrimony; will be at Grant's Tomb at 10 this morning, wearing boutonniere of violets." The nobleman locates his ad in the newspaper with much satisfaction, and smugly pins the violets to his lapel before setting off.

The nobleman paces in front of Grant's Tomb, and is delighted when a young woman arrives; he shakes her hand and bows with much ceremony. When a second woman shows up, he is equally delighted, and shakes her hand as well. Then a third woman arrives, and a fourth, and he begins to become agitated. He continues to bow and shake hands as a crowd of women assembles around him. The women start pushing each other aside and pulling at the man, who is quite shaken. He breaks into a run, and is pursued by all eleven women, with a particularly short and stout woman taking up the rear.

The following scenes offer a comic chase, as the man runs around the corner and over a bridge, trailed by his prospective brides. They chase him over a sand dune and through the woods, over a fence and a fallen log. Finally, the harassed man wades into a river, shouting and gesticulating for the women to leave him alone. The women assemble at the riverbank and continue to cry out for him.

Finally, the stout woman arrives at the bank and wades into the river herself, catching the nobleman. He responds with pleasure, embracing the woman and accepting her as his intended bride. The untidy couple wade together to the other side of the river, with the victorious woman waving goodbye to her colleagues.

== History ==
It was common practice in the early 1900s for motion picture studios to copy other successful films, either by directly duplicating the film or by remaking it. In 1904, the Biograph Company presented their films through their own distribution circuit before offering them to independent distributors, sometimes nine months later. Therefore, when the company had a hit film — as they did with Personal — there was a market of distributors who wanted to screen the film, or at least a remake of it.

How a French Nobleman... is a close remake of Biograph's film, with improved staging and a clearer ending. In Personal, the film ends abruptly when the first woman in line pulls a handgun out of her bag, and points the pistol at her intended fiance. The nobleman instantly agrees, and apologizes to the rest of the women before walking off with his new bride. This is replaced with the comic river sequence in the Edison film.

Siegmund Lubin's company produced a second remake of Personal titled Meet Me at the Fountain, which offered a further twist: the victorious bride was played by a man, celebrated female impersonator Gilbert Sarony.

The Edison version was quite successful; it was on the market within just a few weeks of the original film's debut, and many exhibitors preferred the remake. Around the same time, Edwin Porter also remade Biograph's The Escaped Lunatic as Maniac Chase.

Biograph retaliated against Edison by filing suit for copyright infringement. Edison's lawyers argued that Biograph had only copyrighted Personal as a series of photographs, and not as a dramatic production; since the remake didn't use the same photographs, it did not infringe on their copyright. Jennifer Forrest writes, "A viewer today would need no further evidence to see that Edison's film was an unauthorized imitation of Personal, but given early film's connections to largely unprotected vaudeville and fairground attractions where performers' acts were routinely stolen outright, it was far from certain that a moving picture's way of telling a story warranted protection."

Judges ruled in Edison's favor, both at a lower court and on appeal. From then on, Biograph began to copyright its films both as photographs and as a dramatic production, and recognized that they would have to offer their films to independent distributors soon after their debut on the Biograph circuit.

== See also ==
- Edwin S. Porter filmography
