= 1904 in film =

The year 1904 in film involved some significant events.

== Events ==
- As shown in the film series Westinghouse Works, some filmmakers begin to move away from eye-level filmmaking and use the camera to explore spaces from an angle usually inaccessible to the average person.
- William Fox purchases his first Nickelodeon.
- 23 June: Marcus Loew founds the theatre chain, the People's Vaudeville Company, which later was renamed Loews Theatres which was the oldest theatre chain operating in North America when it was merged with AMC Theatres in 2006

== Notable films ==
=== A ===
- Audley Range School, Blackburn, produced by Mitchell and Kenyon – (UK)
- Automobile Race for the Vanderbilt Cup, directed by Billy Bitzer and A.E. Weed – (US)

=== B ===
- The Bewitched Traveller, directed by Lewin Fitzhamon and Cecil Hepworth – (UK)
- Blackpool Victoria Pier, produced by Mitchell and Kenyon – (UK)
- The Bold Bank Robbery, directed by Jack Frawley – (US)
- Buy Your Own Cherries, directed by Robert W. Paul – (UK)

=== C ===
- The Cook in Trouble (Sorcellerie culinaire), directed by Georges Méliès – (France)

=== D ===
- A Day in the Hayfields, directed by Cecil Hepworth – (UK)

=== E ===
- An Englishman Trip to Paris from London, directed by Lewin Fitzhamon – (UK)
- The European Rest Cure, directed by Edwin S. Porter – (US)

=== F ===
- Faust and Marguerite (Damnation du docteur Faust), directed by Georges Méliès, based on the 1859 opera by Charles Gounod – (France)
- A Fire in a Burlesque Theatre, directed by A.E. Weed – (US)

=== G ===
- Girls Taking Time Checks, directed by Billy Bitzer – (US)

=== I ===
- The Impossible Voyage (Le Voyage à travers l'impossible), directed by Georges Méliès, based on the 1882 stage play Journey Through the Impossible by Jules Verne – (France)

=== L ===
- The Lost Child, directed by Wallace McCutcheon Sr. – (US)

=== M ===
- A Miracle Under the Inquisition (Un miracle sous l'inquisition), directed by Georges Méliès – (France)
- The Mistletoe Bough, directed by Percy Stow – (UK)
- The Moonshiner, directed by Wallace McCutcheon Sr. – (US)

=== O ===
- Opening of Drill Hall, Accrington by General Baden-Powell, produced by Mitchell and Kenyon – (UK)

=== P ===
- Princess Rajah Dance, directed by A.E. Weed – (US)

=== R ===
- A Railway Tragedy, produced by the Gaumont-British Picture Corporation – (UK)

=== S ===
- The Strike (La Grève), directed by Ferdinand Zecca – (France)
- The Suburbanite, directed by Wallace McCutcheon Sr. – (US)

=== T ===
- Tchin-Chao, the Chinese Conjurer (Le Thaumaturge chinois), directed by Georges Méliès – (France)
- Troubles of a Manager of a Burlesque Show, directed by Wallace McCutcheon Sr. – (US)

=== W ===
- Westinghouse Works, 1904, a collection of 21 short films directed by Billy Bitzer – (US)
- The Widow and the Only Man, directed by Wallace McCutcheon Sr. – (US)
- The Wonderful Living Fan (Le Merveilleux Éventail vivant), directed by Georges Méliès – (France)

== Births ==
Month	Date	Name	Country	Profession	Died
January	10	Ray Bolger	US	Actor, dancer, singer	1987
January	17	Patsy Ruth Miller	US	Actress	1995
January	18	Cary Grant	UK	Actor	1986
January	20	Fabia Drake	UK	Actress	1990
January	28	Anthony Havelock-Allan	UK	Producer, screenwriter	2003
February	7	Rocco D'Assunta	Italy	Actor, comedian, Playwright	1970
February	10	John Farrow	Australia	Director, producer, screenwriter	1963
March	1	Glenn Miller	US	Musician, Actor	1944
March	3	Mayo Methot	US	Actress	1951
March	5	George Meeker	US	Actor	1984
March	15	George Brent	Ireland	Actor	1979
April	3	Iron Eyes Cody	US	Actor	1999
April	14	John Gielgud	UK	Actor	2000
April	16	Fifi D'Orsay	Canada	Actress, singer	1983
April	20	Bruce Cabot	US	Actor	1972
May	7	Val Lewton	Russia	Producer, screenwriter	1951
May	13	Chishū Ryū	Japan	Actor	1993
May	17	Jean Gabin	France	Actor, singer	1976
May	21	Robert Montgomery	US	Actor, director, producer	1981
May	25	Gregorio Fernandez	Philippines	Actor, director	1978
May	29	Gregg Toland	US	Cinematographer	1948
June	1	George Hurrell	US	Photographer	1992
June	2	Johnny Weissmuller	US	Actor, Olympic Swimmer	1984
June	12	Enid Stamp Taylor	UK	Actress	1946
June	17	Ralph Bellamy	US	Actor	1991
June	18	Keye Luke	China	Actor	1991
June	24	Phil Harris	US	Actor, comedian, Songwriter, Musician	1995
June	26	Peter Lorre	Slovakia	Actor	1964
June	30	Glenda Farrell	US	Actress	1971
July	5	Milburn Stone	US	Actor	1980
July	10	Lili Damita	France	Actress, singer	1994
August	13	Charles "Buddy" Rogers	US	Actor, Musician	1999
August	24	Alice White	US	Actress	1983
September	1	Johnny Mack Brown	US	Actor	1974
September	2	Joan Henley	Ireland	Actress	1986
September	13	Gladys George	US	Actress	1954
September	29	Greer Garson	UK	Actress, singer	1996
September	29	Michał Waszyński	Poland	Director	1965
October	20	Anna Neagle	UK	Actress, singer, dancer	1986
October	22	Constance Bennett	US	Actress, producer	1965
October	29	Perc Westmore	UK	Make-Up Artist	1970
November	1	Laura La Plante	US	Actress	1996
November	11	Andrzej Bogucki	Poland	Actor, singer, Songwriter	1978
November	14	Dick Powell	US	Actor, Musician, Producer, Director, Studio Head	1963
November	25	Jessie Royce Landis	US	Actress	1972
December	6	Elissa Landi	Italy	Actress	1948
December	7	Clarence Nash	US	Voice Actor	1985

== Deaths ==
- May 8 – Eadweard Muybridge, cinematographer (born 1830)
- July 15 – Anton Chekhov, writer (born 1860)
- September 22 – Wilson Barrett, actor, writer (born 1846)
