= How Jones Lost His Roll =

1905 film by Edwin S. Porter

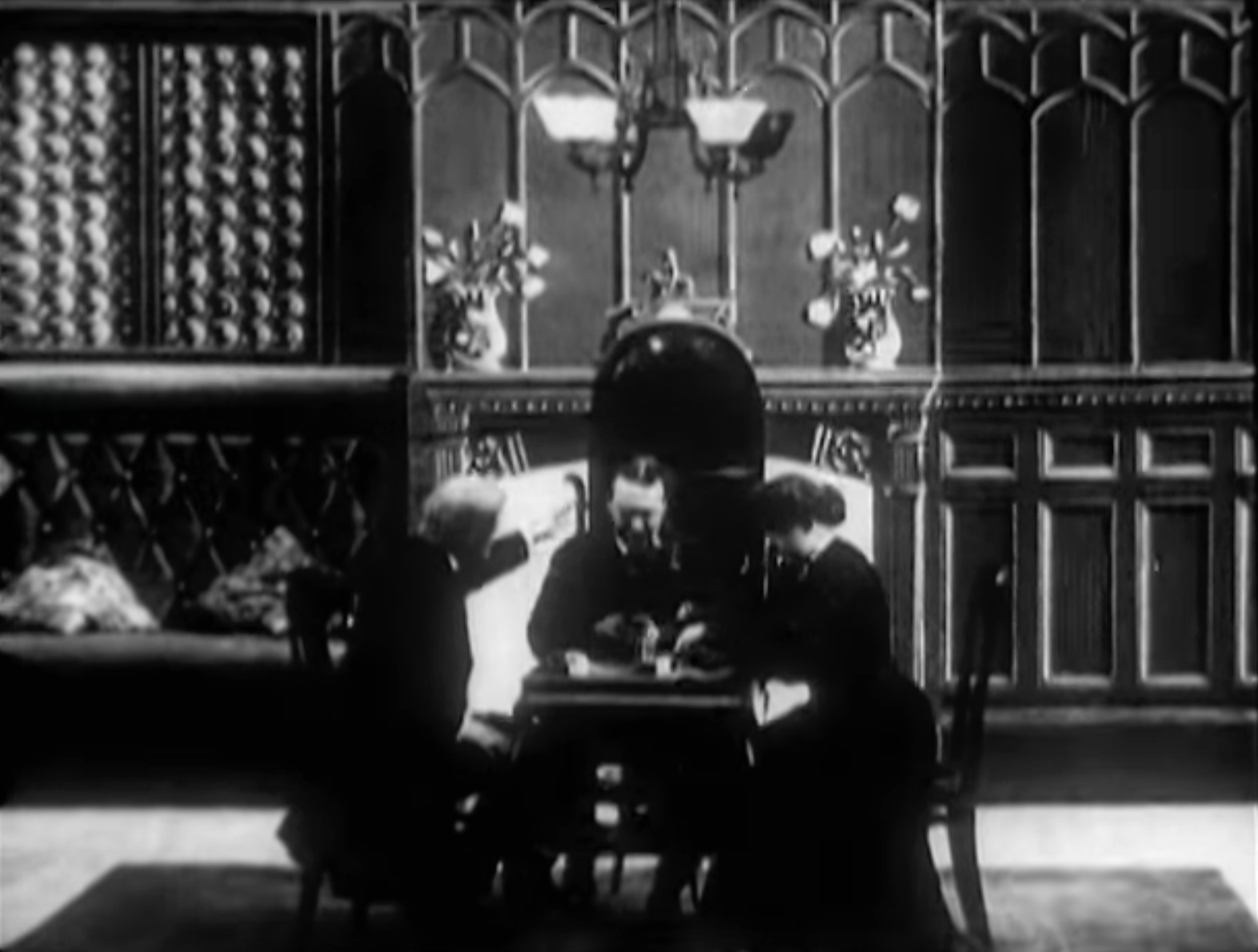
- Directed by: Edwin S. Porter
- Distributed by: Edison Manufacturing Company
- Release date: March 27, 1905
- Running time: 7 minutes
- Country: United States
- Language: Silent/English

How Jones Lost His Roll is a 1905 silent short comedy film directed by Edwin S. Porter. The movie was popular for its clever use of animated title cards — the first example of stop-motion animation in American film.

== Plot ==
Mr. Jones happens to meet his neighbor Mr. Skinflint on the street. Skinflint invites Jones to dinner, and the two enter Skinflint's house. Skinflint plies Jones with cheap wine, and then proposes a game of cards.

Before the game, Skinflint's wife and her maid set up a mirror behind the chair where Jones will be sitting. Jones sits down and begins to play cards with Mr. and Mrs. Skinflint, who each sneak peeks at Jones' cards in the mirror. The couple also hand each other cards under the table while Jones isn't looking. To his surprise, Jones loses hand after hand, and ends up robbed even of his suit. In the last scene, Jones exits the Skinflints' house and walks down the street wearing his underclothes and a barrel.

== Stop-motion animation ==
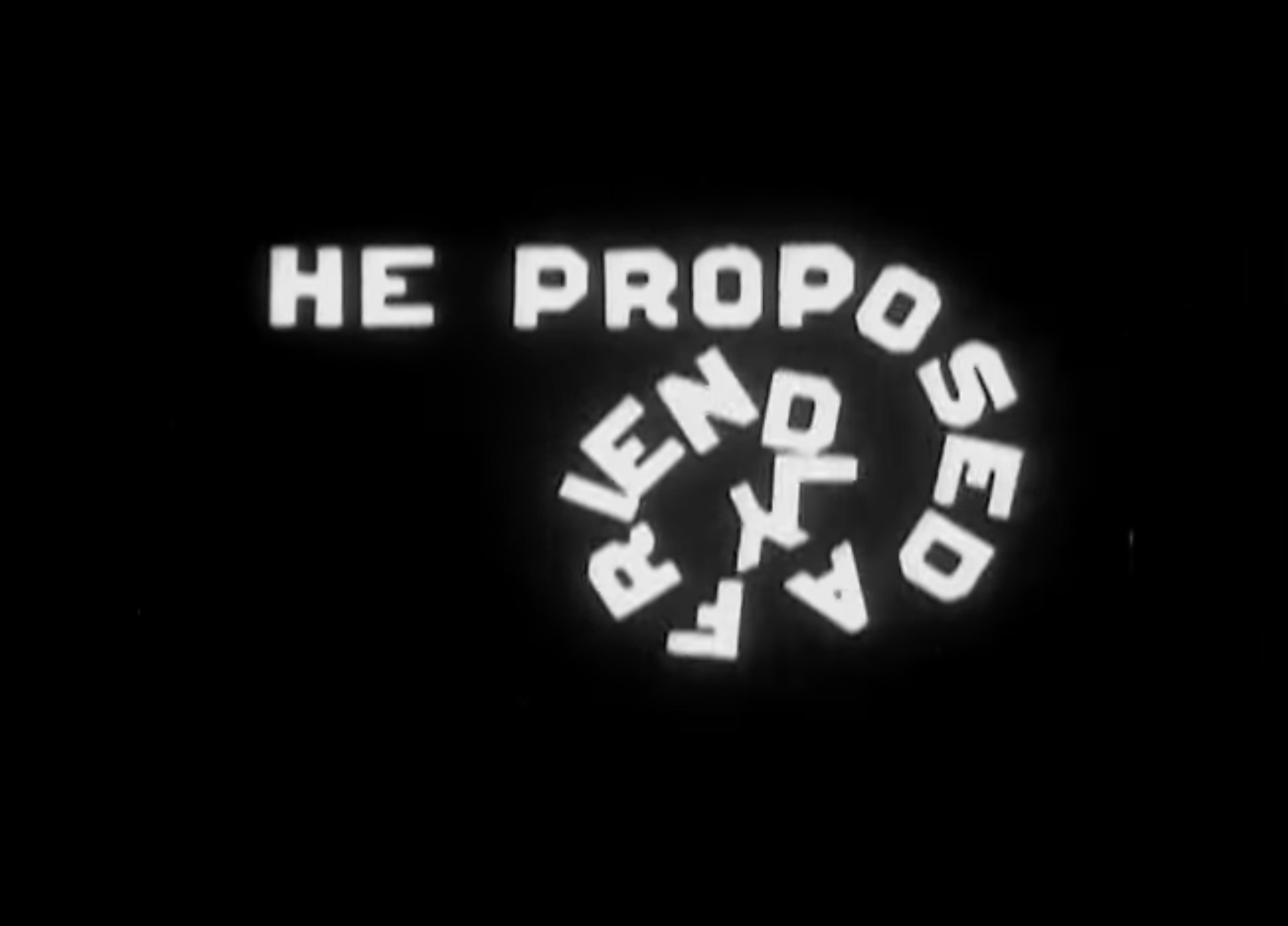
An example of the stop-motion titles, spelling out "He proposed a friendly game of cards".

This is the earliest known use of stop-motion animation in American moving pictures. Earlier films that included stop-motion letter animation, i.e. Georges Méliès' 1898 work in France and Arthur Melbourne-Cooper's 1900 work in England were not made for export, and it is unlikely that Porter had seen those films before "rediscovering" the technique. Porter modified the camera to introduce "single-frame filming," in which the camera was cranked to expose one frame of film at a time.

In each intertitle sequence, a jumble of letters moves across the screen and resolves into the title. Each title follows a different pattern, including a spiral in one title. The approach included whimsical, comic touches, including one character leaving the screen to "fetch" another missing character.

According to Kemp R. Niver in The First Twenty Years: A Segment of Film History, "The stir that the amusing animated titles of the Edison film How Jones Lost His Roll caused when it was released was nothing less than sensational."

Porter used this letter-animation trick in three further films in 1905: The Whole Dam Family and the Dam Dog, Coney Island at Night, and Everybody Works but Father. In 1906, Porter used stop-motion to animate shoes and furniture that move by themselves in Dream of a Rarebit Fiend, and in 1907, he made his last animated film, The 'Teddy' Bears.

== Distribution ==
Edison's promotional materials announced:

"From beginning to end the audience is kept in one continual state of expectancy while the pictures show “How Jones Lost His Roll,” the letters, after much effort and manoeuvering disentangle themselves at intervals and tell the story in words. Further description is unnecessary and would only detract from the interest and novelty, the same as exposing a trick before performing it. Everyone wants to know how it is done. The film is very fine photographically, beautifully tinted, and one of the most novel that has ever been produced. No exhibitor should be without one of these films. It is sure to make the biggest kind of a hit."

As with many Edison films at the time, individual scenes could be purchased and shown independently. The seven scenes in How Jones Lost His Roll were sold as:

- Part 1: Jones Meets Skinflint
- Part 2: Skinflint Treats Jones
- Part 3: Invitation to Dinner
- Part 4: Skinflint's Cheap Wine
- Part 5: Game of Cards
- Part 6: Jones Loses
- Part 7: Jones Goes Home in a Barrel

The print that's in common circulation today only has five parts, minus "Skinflint Treats Jones" and "Skinflint's Cheap Wine".

== See also ==
- Edwin S. Porter filmography
