= The Whole Dam Family and the Dam Dog =

1905 film by Edwin S. Porter

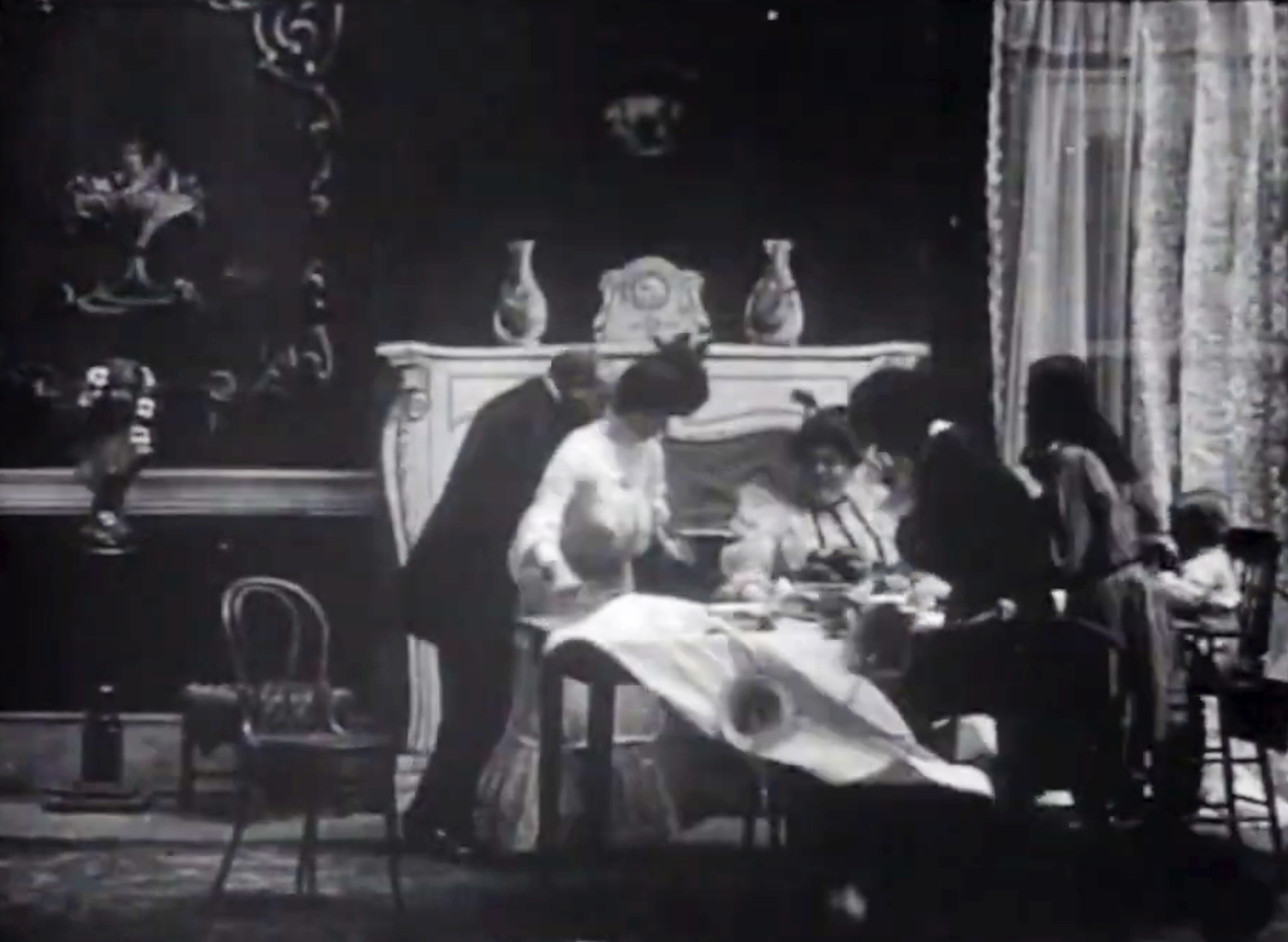
- Directed by: Edwin S. Porter
- Starring: William Courtenay, Frank Daniels, May Irwin, Charlotte Walker
- Cinematography: Wallace McCutcheon Sr.
- Distributed by: Edison Manufacturing Company
- Release date: May 31, 1905
- Running time: 5:30
- Country: United States
- Language: Silent/English

The Whole Dam Family and the Dam Dog is a 1905 silent short comedy film directed by Edwin S. Porter for the Edison Manufacturing Company. The five-and-a-half minute film was an adaptation of a popular picture postcard featuring a humorously named family. The film introduces each member of the Dam family, and then shows a raucous dinner scene that ends with the Dam dog pulling the tablecloth off the table, and ruining the Dam meal.

The film includes a very early example of cutout animation, with a jumble of letters coming together to spell the titles, and an animated paper silhouette of the Dam dog which wags its tail.

== Plot ==
The film begins with a caption: "DO YOU KNOW THIS FAMILY?"

Then each member of the family is presented in medium close-up, with a name card labeling the character:

- "Mr. I.B. Dam": A fat-faced gent wearing a suit and bow tie, who sneezes uncontrollably.
- "Herself": A middle-aged mother, who talks incessantly.
- "Miss U.B. Dam": A young woman who has her hair fixed up into a large bun, smiling and preening.
- "Jimmy Dam": A slick young man with a hat and a turned-up nose. He lights a match on his collar and then smokes a cigarette, blowing smoke out of one side of his mouth and then through his nostrils.
- "Annie Dam": A shy young woman who coquettishly stares into the camera, overshadowed by a ridiculously large white hat.
- "Lizzie Dam": A smirking young child who chews gum, happily pulling it out of her mouth in a string and then chewing it again.
- "Baby Dam": A screaming, crying child with slicked-down hair.

A jumble of cutout letters are animated to unscramble themselves, and resolve into the title "THE WHOLE DAM FAMILY". This is followed by a family portrait-style shot of the Dams.

Another title card reads: "AND THE DAM DOG". Under that caption, a number of white shapes swirl and then resolve into a silhouette portrait of a dog. The dog's tail wags, and then a silhouette of firecrackers are attached to the tail. The dog explodes back into its component parts, and the caption is blown off the screen.

Then the family is seen sitting around a table, eating dinner. The dog is sitting in Father's chair, and Mr. Dam shouts at the family, clearly annoyed by the dog's presence. He grabs the chair and dumps the dog onto the floor, but the dog grabs hold of a chair leg with his teeth and rips the chair out of Mr. Dam's hands.

The scene resets, in an apparent retake, and this time, the dog jumps to the floor and exits the scene. Mr. Dam sits down, and starts to serve soup to the family. Seeing that Jimmy is smoking at the table, Father jumps up and shouts at him to put the cigarette out. Jimmy pinches the cigarette to extinguish it, and reaches to place it on the mantelpiece, but Mr. Dam shouts again and Jimmy theatrically throws the cigarette on the floor.

Father sits down again, knocking a plate onto the floor, which has to be retrieved. Mr. Dam continues serving soup, which the family slurps up in an unmannerly way. Then the dog rushes back into the room, grabs the tablecloth and pulls it off the table, dumping the entire dinner on the floor. The family stands up, reacting to the chaos as the film closes.

== Production ==
It was common for Edison comedies to adapt fads of the day to the screen. Edison's promotion for the film announced that it was based on "a popular fad which has been widely advertised by lithographs and souvenir mailing cards and has recently been made the subject of a sketch in a New York Vaudeville Theatre." There was also a popular novelty song in 1905, "The Whole Dam Family," by George Totten Smith and Albert von Tilzer.

The film's opening sequence introducing the family is a spoof on a format previously used in the Biograph Company film The Widow and the Only Man (1904), in which each principal character is identified with a head-and-shoulder close-up and a name card. In The Whole Dam Family, Porter's comic twist on the technique is that each cast member does a bit of stage business illustrating the character's annoying flaws.

The animated letters sequence is an extension of a technique that Porter had used two months earlier in How Jones Lost His Roll. These films introduced "single-frame filming", in which the camera was cranked to expose one frame of film at a time. This soon became the standard animation technique. The process was also used in Porter's film adaptation of the song "Everybody Works But Father" (Nov 1905).

This is the earliest film known to include actors in makeup (besides blackface and whiskers), which was used to give the cast a family resemblance.

The Dam dog is played by "Mannie", a canine performer first seen in Edison films in Laura Comstock's Bag-Punching Dog (1901).

== Distribution ==
The film is 138 feet long. The Edison company sometimes sold its early films in parts to exhibitors that only wanted to show a particular scene. Four parts of The Whole Dam Family were available: "Sneezing", "Cigarette Fiend", "Cry Baby" and "Chewing Gum".

== Reception ==
The Whole Dam Family was the most popular film of 1905. It sold 92 prints in that year, and 136 copies within a year and a half.

Two months after the film's release, the Lubin Manufacturing Company released a similar film, called I.B. Dam and the Whole Dam Family. This copycat film only included close-up shots of the characters, and not the narrative scene.

== See also ==
- Edwin S. Porter filmography
