= Mr. Pecksniff Fetches the Doctor =

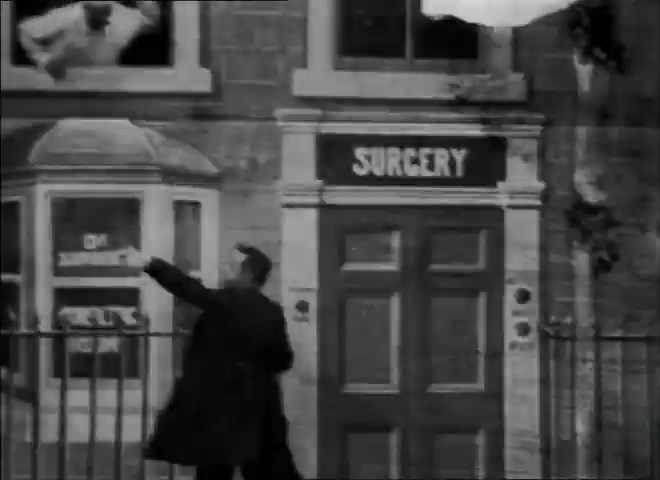
- Screenshot from the film
- Directed by: Robert W. Paul
- Produced by: Robert W. Paul
- Production company: Paul's Animatograph Works
- Release date: 1904
- Running time: 2 minutes
- Country: United Kingdom
- Language: Silent

Mr. Pecksniff Fetches the Doctor (AKA: Oh, What a Surprise!) is a 1904 British short silent comedy film, directed by Robert W. Paul, featuring a man woken up in the middle of the night and fetching a doctor as his wife is on the point of giving birth.

== Plot ==
A man is quietly sleeping; a nurse enters and wakes him. He dresses in a hurry and fetches the doctor and awaits the result in an adjoining room. When the nurse enters with three bouncing babies, their father collapses.

== Analysis ==
The film is composed of five shots taken by a fixed camera.

1. Full shot of a theatre-like set representing a bedroom.

2. Outdoor set. A street with a row of houses with front gardens.

3. Full shot of a theatre-like set representing the facade of a surgery.

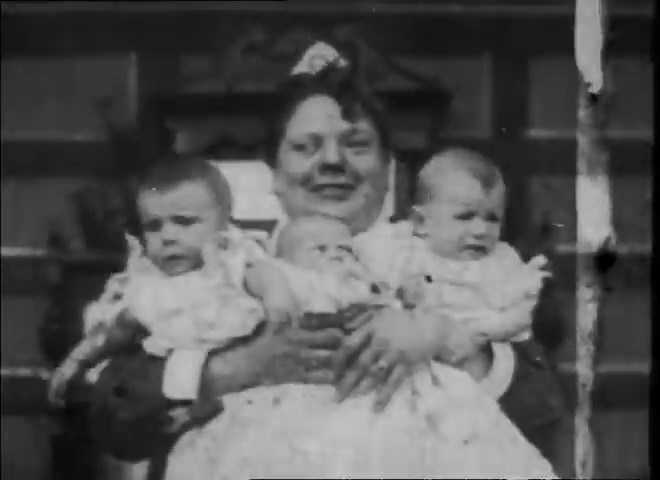
Screenshot from the film

4. Full shot of a theatre-like set of a parlour.

5. Medium close-up of the maid laughing while holding the three babies (only one them really looking like a newborn).

The story is pretty simple but has an amusing twist at the end. No intertitle is necessary to follow it. No camera movements are used but continuity editing allows to show an action continuing over different spaces and the use of medium close-up makes it possible to have a good view of the expressions of the actors. While shot 2 is filmed in a real street, the other shots use community-theatre-grade painted backdrops.

The name of the protagonist is taken from one of the characters in Charles Dickens' novel Martin Chuzzlewit but the film bears otherwise no relation to Dickens' novel.
