= Music Master =

Music Master, MusicMaster or Music Masters may refer to:

== Film, theater and video ==
- The Music Master (play), 1904 American play by Charles Klein
- The Music Master (1908 film), American short silent drama
- The Music Master (1927 film), American silent drama, adapted from Klein's play
- The Music Master (1945 film), Canadian drama, French title Le Père Chopin
- Music Master: Chopin, Polish Bloober Team video game on 200th anniversary of his 1810 birth

== Music ==
- Fender Musicmaster, solid body electric guitar produced between 1956 and 1982
- Fender Musicmaster Bass, electric bass guitar, produced between 1971 and 1981
- MusicMasters Records, American New Jersey-based record label founded in 1981
- MusicMaster (software), music scheduling software initiated in 1983
- Music Master, international record label, primarily issuing songs from Middle East, such as "Einak"
- Music Masters, British music education charity founded in 2007, a/k/a London Music Masters/LMM
- Music mastering, form of audio post production
