= List of American films of 1904 =

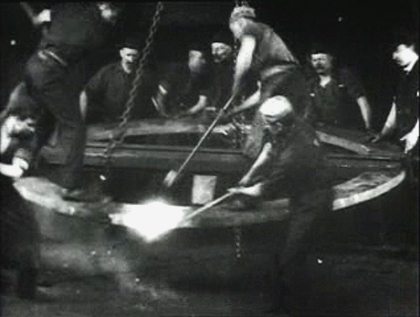
Westinghouse Works

A list of American films released in 1904.

Title	Director	Cast	Genre	Notes
Alligator Farm			Documentary	Shot during the summer of 1903 at Atlantic City, New Jersey
The Automobile Race				
The Chicago Fire			Live documentary	Captured a fire in Chicago filming firefighters on the roofs of buildings throwing streams of water on the burning structure with black smoke
Decoyed				
A Ferry in the Far East				
Fording a Stream				
The Great Baltimore Fire				
High Diving and Reverse				
Hurdle Jumping				
An Intelligent Elephant				
The Monkey Bicyclist				
Monkey, Dog and Pony Circus				
Nervy Nat Kisses the Bride	Edwin S. Porter		Comedy	
A Nigger in the Woodpile				
Parsifal	Edwin S. Porter			
The Lover's Ruse				
A Race for a Kiss				
Raid on a Coiner's Den				
Revenge!				
A Railway Tragedy				
Scarecrow Pump	Edwin Stanton Porter		Comedy	
The Strenuous Life; or, Anti-Race Suicide	Edwin S. Porter		Comedy	
The Suburbanite	Wallace McCutcheon		Comedy	
Westinghouse Works, 1904				

== See also ==
- AFI Catalog of Feature Films
- 1904 in the United States
