= The Nihilist (film) =

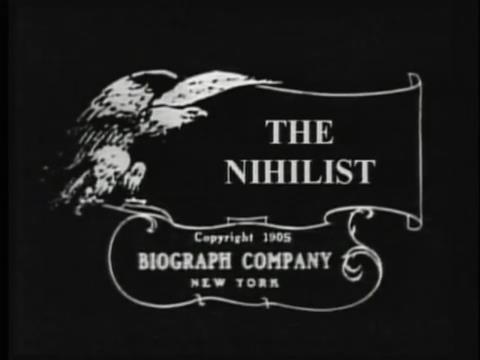
- Directed by: Wallace McCutcheon, Sr.
- Written by: Frank Marion, Wallace McCutcheon
- Starring: Edward Dillon
- Distributed by: Biograph Company
- Release date: March 28, 1905
- Running time: 11 minutes
- Country: United States
- Languages: Silent film with English intertitles

The Nihilist is a 1905 American short silent film directed by Wallace McCutcheon, Sr. It takes place in the Russian Empire and relates the story of a woman who joins the Nihilist movement and commits a suicide attack against the Governor's palace to avenge her husband who died because of police repression.

== Plot ==
After her husband has been arrested by the Tsarist police, a woman begs the governor for mercy, without success. He is condemned to be deported to Siberia and dies on the way. She decides to join a nihilist group and is ordered to bomb the governor's palace. She dies while completing her mission.
