= Charles J. Ross =

Vaudeville actor (1859–1918)

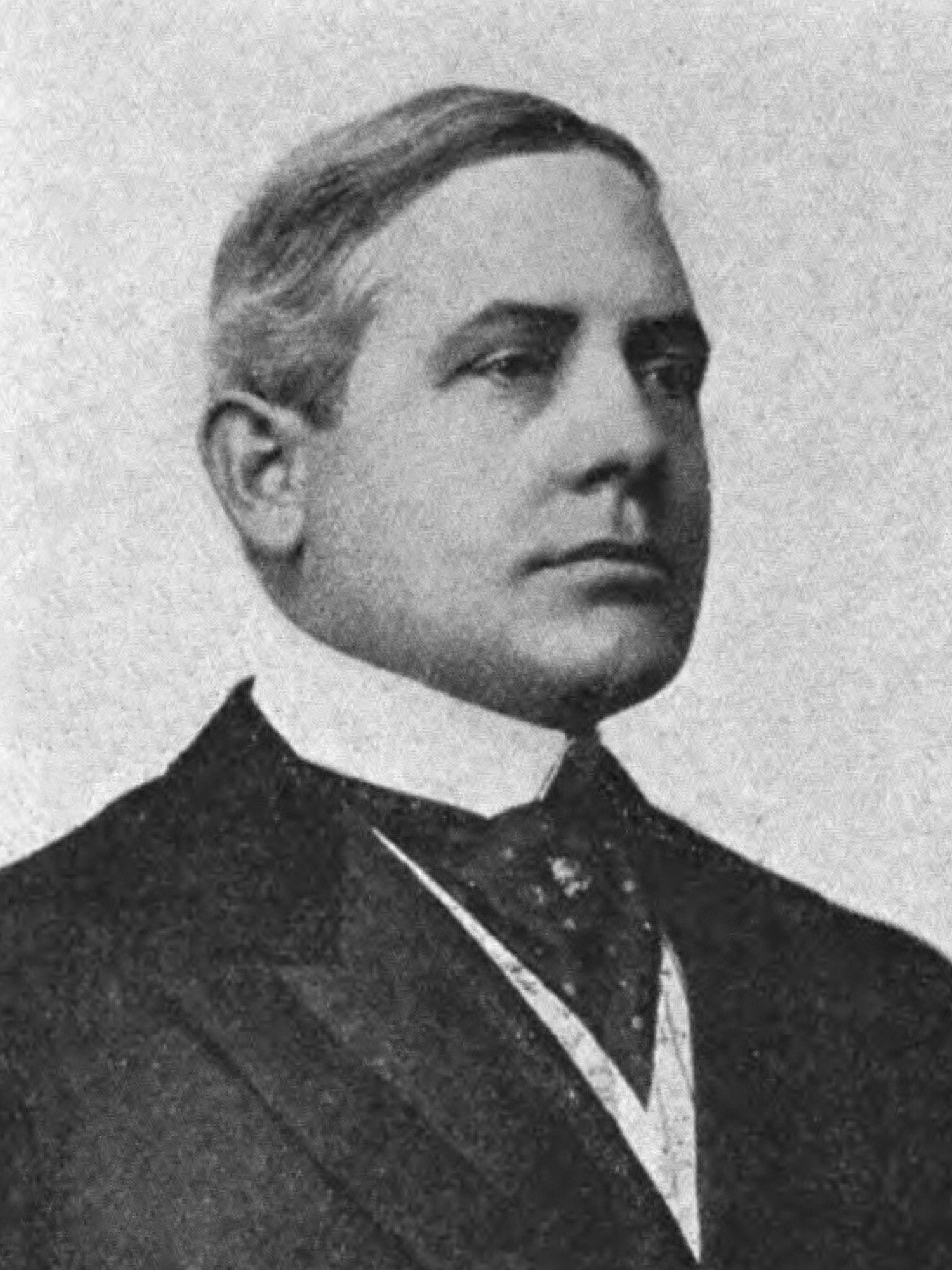
- ca. 1909
- Born: Charles Joseph Kelly; February 18, 1859; Montreal, Canada East
- Died: June 15, 1918 (aged 59); Asbury Park, New Jersey, United States
- Resting place: Glenwood Cemetery
- Occupations: Entertainer, composer and theatrical producer
- Spouse: Mabel Fenton (m. 1887–1918)
- Writing career
- Years active: 1885–1915

Charles Joseph Kelly (February 18, 1859 – June 15, 1918), known professionally as Charles J. Ross or Charley Ross, was a Canadian-American entertainer, composer and theatrical producer who performed in vaudeville, burlesque, and on the stage. Ross and his wife, Mabel Fenton, became popular for their parodies of classical plays.

== Early life ==
Ross was born Charles Joseph Kelly to William and Caroline (née Brown) Kelly at Montreal, Canada East, where his father was employed as a carpenter.

== Career ==
Ross began as a circus entertainer with P. T. Barnum before his stage debut on April 5, 1885, at Miner's Bowery Theatre in Manhattan as a singer and impersonator. Next he performed with Herman's Transatlantic in a variety act at the Atlantic Gardens Bowery Theater. Over the next few years, Ross would develop his talent as a farce comedian playing with vaudeville companies in New York and on the road. In 1901 he portrayed the drag role of Queen Spadia in the Broadway musical The Sleeping Beauty and the Beast.

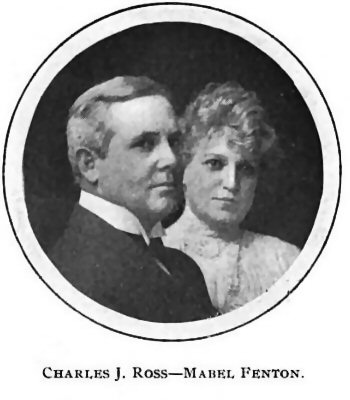
Driftwood of the Stage, 1904

Ross married actress Ada Towne (known professionally as Mabel Fenton) on June 9, 1887, during a stopover at Deadwood, South Dakota amidst a vaudeville tour of the American West. The couple soon created the act Ross and Fenton and within two years became a staple of the Weber and Fields Company in New York performing their farce productions of classic and popular plays of the day. Ross later formed his own company and continued to perform well into the early decades of the twentieth century. The couple appeared in at least two films: Death of Nancy Sykes (1897) and How Molly Malone Made Good (1915).

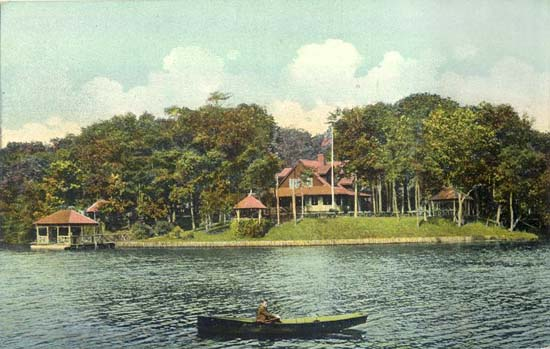
Ross-Fenton Farm, circa 1900

In the late 1890s, Ross and his wife opened Ross Fenton Farm, a resort hotel in Asbury Park, New Jersey that also doubled as their primary residence. For a number of years, Ross Fenton Farm was a popular mecca for New York area artist and entertainers. Most of the resort burned to the ground in 1950. Some of the original houses are still standing, including the main house of Charles Ross and Mable Fenton.

== Death ==
Ross died on June 15, 1918, at Ross Fenton Farm after a long illness and failed operation. Ross' wife Mabel died on April 19, 1931, in Los Angeles at the age of 66. They are buried together at Glenwood Cemetery in West Long Branch, New Jersey.

== Broadway credits ==
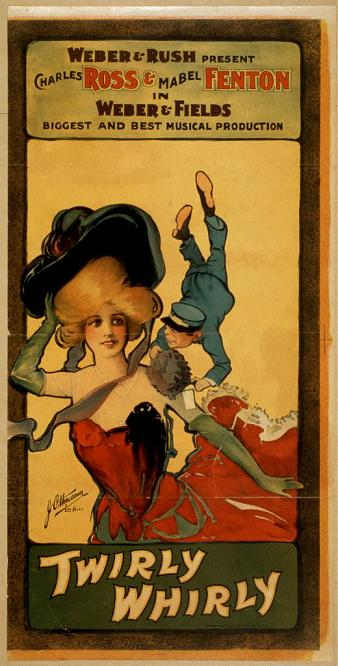
Poster for Ross & Fenton's Twirly Whirly (Library of Congress ca. 1890s)

| Date | Production | Role | Notes |
|---|---|---|---|
| April 6 – May 27, 1899 | Helter Skelter | Lord Shaggy Shetland | |
| September 21, 1899 – May 5, 1900 | Whirl-i-gig | Performer | |
| September 6, 1900 – April 20, 1901 | Fiddle-dee-dee | Marcus Finishus; Lieutenant Tention | |
| February 11 – May 4, 1901 | My Lady | Cardinal Richelieu | |
| November 4, 1901 – May 31, 1902 | The Sleeping Beauty and the Beast | Queen Spadia | |
| September 24, 1903 – May 28, 1904 | Catherine | Duke de Coocoo | |
| April 9 – September 15, 1906 | The Social Whirl | Julian Endicott | Lyricist and songwriter |
| April 1 – April 14, 1907 | The Social Whirl | Performer | |
| July 8 – November 10, 1907 | Ziegfeld Follies of 1907 | Performer | |
| January 2 – May 16, 1908 | The Merry Widow Burlesque | Prince Dandilo | |
| November 16, 1908 – January 30, 1909 | The Merry Widow and The Devil | Prince Dandilo | |
| September 1, 1909 – January 1910 | The Love Cure | Torrelli | |
| October 23 – October 1911 | Mrs. Avery | – | Producer |
| April 11 – September 7, 1912 | A Winsome Widow | Rashleigh Gay | |
| July 22 – November 16, 1912 | The Passing Show of 1912 | Performer | |

== Filmography ==
| Year | Title | Role | Notes |
|---|---|---|---|
| 1897 | Death of Nancy Sykes | Bill Sykes | Short film |
| 1904 | The Story the Biograph Told | Adulterous husband. With Mabel Fenton. | Short film for Edison. |
| 1914 | The Great Diamond Robbery | Mr. Bulford | |
| 1914 | A Double Haul | | Short film Alternative title: The Millionaire Detective |
| 1914 | A Strange Adventure | | Short film |
| 1915 | How Molly Malone Made Good | Himself, Cameo Appearance | |
| 1915 | The Senator | | |
| 1916 | Who Killed Simon Baird? | John Maitland | Alternative title: By Whose Hand? |
