= Miner's Bowery Theatre =

Coordinates: 40°43′11″N 73°59′38″W

- Miner's Bowery Theatre
- Interactive map of the Miner's Bowery Theatre area

General information
- Location: Manhattan, New York City
- Opened: 1878
- Demolished: 1929

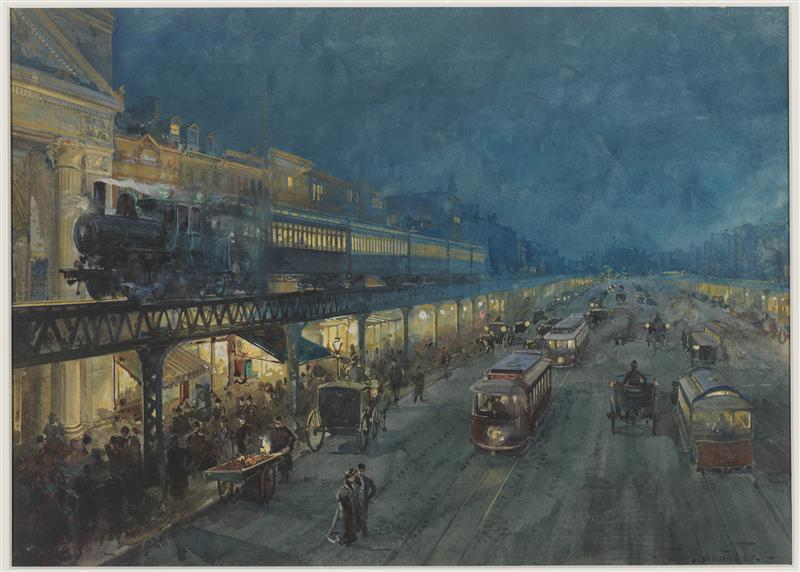
Crowds along the "Bowery at night," c. 1895 painting by William Louis Sonntag, Jr.

Miner's Bowery Theatre was a vaudeville or variety show theater opened in the Bowery of New York by Senator Henry Clay Miner in 1878.

== History ==
The theater was known for its method of encouraging anyone to get on stage and perform on amateur nights, and for its method of removing bad performers from the stage by yanking them off with a wooden hook. Starting in the 1890s, a stage-prop shepherd's hook was used to pull bad performers bodily from the stage, after audience members shouted, "Give 'im the hook." The phrase, "Give him the hook" originated at Miners Bowery Theatre.

The theater is also known for its audiences, the rich in their 70-cent seats, down to the poor down on the floor, who got in for 10 cents.

Beer was served. The environment of the hall was raucous, and those with shaky talent were greeted with "jeers, whistles and catcalls." However, when the crowd was pleased, their yelling and stamping with approval literally shook the roof. The rough audience created an interactive atmosphere where members would yell to the performers.

Acts in the theater included singing, dancing and acrobatics, blackface comedy, jugglers and singing quartets. Larger groups would "burlesque" other musical shows.

The theater was destroyed by a fire August 8, 1929.

== List of notable performers at Bowery's ==
- Sam Bernard, vaudeville comedian
- Eddie Cantor, comedian
- Jeremiah Cohan and Helen Cohan, parents of George M. Cohan
- Sam Devere, comedian for General Grant, blackface minstrel, banjoist
- Lottie Gilson, Comedian
- Thomas Kurton Heath of McIntire and Heath
- William A. Huntley musician, banjoist
- James McIntyre of McIntyre and Heath
- Kitty O'Neil, variety-theater dancer
- Charles J. Ross and wife Maybel Fenton, vaudeville comedian
- Alfred E. Smith
- Jennie Yeamans, former child actress, sung in 1870s and 1880s
