= A Nigger in the Woodpile =

1904 blackface minstrel silent short comedy film from the United States

- Cinematography: A. E. Weed
- Production company: American Mutoscope and Biograph Company
- Distributed by: American Mutoscope and Biograph Company
- Release date: April 8, 1904
- Running time: 4 minutes
- Country: United States
- Language: Silent

A Nigger in the Woodpile is a 1904 American silent film, with a runtime of four minutes. The title is derived from the idiom nigger in the woodpile, meaning something is wrong or "off". A copy is in the black films section of the Library of Congress.

== Synopsis ==
A deacon, played by a white actor in blackface, is constantly stealing firewood from a white farmer. The farmer, with the help of a companion, places a stick of dynamite in one of the blocks, hoping to rid himself of the thievery in this way. When the deacon returns with an older man (also an actor in blackface) to steal wood he is fooled into taking the dynamite with him, hidden in one of the blocks he stole. He goes home where his wife (again played by a male actor in blackface) is cooking. He places three blocks in the fireplace, the last of which contains the dynamite. Shortly after, it explodes, but no one is killed. The farmer and his friend enter and haul off the old man.

The film was shot in a studio in New York City.

== Analysis ==
Writing about the film's racist content, in Migrating to the Movies: Cinema and Black Urban Modernity, author Jacqueline Najuma Stewart states that the blackfaced actors are "wearing costumes signifying their traditional racial "types": Mammy in apron and bandanna; an uppity "colored deacon," striking Zip Coon figure in top hat and tails: and his partner in crime, a harmless, shabbily dressed, white-haired Uncle Remus. The film depicts African Americans as habitual thieves,... And the film's "punitive" ending (a commonplace in early film comedies) functions to bring about narrative closure at the expense of the black transgressors."

== See also ==
- List of American films of 1904
