= Bobby's Kodak =

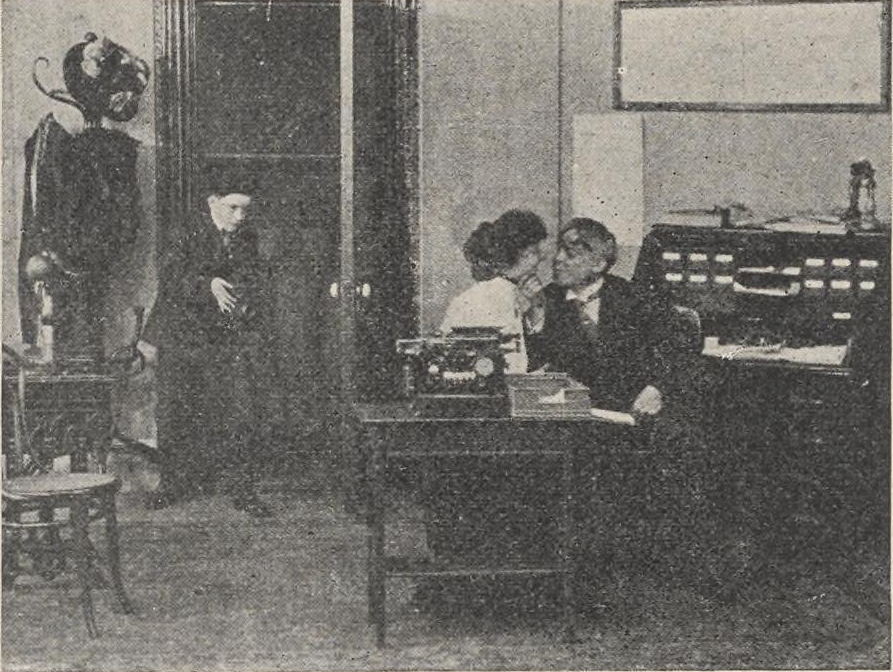
- Directed by: Wallace McCutcheon
- Starring: Edward Dillon; Robert Harron
- Production company: American Mutoscope & Biograph
- Distributed by: American Mutoscope & Biograph
- Release date: February 10, 1908
- Running time: 1 reel
- Country: United States
- Languages: Silent film (English intertitles)

Bobby's Kodak is a 1908 American silent short comedy film directed by Wallace McCutcheon and starring Edward Dillon and Robert Harron. The film was released by American Mutoscope & Biograph on February 10, 1908.

== Plot ==
According to a contemporary magazine, "Papa brings home the kodak for Bobby, and at once instructs him how to work it. First the family arranged and a snap taken; then baby, grandpa, and so on. Bobby has now gotten a pretty clear idea of the thing and resolves to go it alone —and he does with a vengeance. He yearns for something more spicy and piquant, and his yearning was soon appeased. Going to his dad's room, where paterfamilias is indulging in a quiet nap, he sees mamma extracting the loose change from papa's pockets. Click goes the infernal machine and the damaging evidence is recorded. To the kitchen he is drawn by this evil genius, the kodak, and there finds Maggie and the cop brightening their condition of social ostracism with apple pie and kisses. Click. Later in the day papa's office is visited. Bobby now becomes the star of an evening's entertainment home with the stereopticon show. On the sheet in the parlor are thrown the various scenes. Papa finally smashes the machine."

== Cast ==
- Edward Dillon as Father
- Robert Harron as Son

== Preservation ==
The film was considered a lost film for decades until a copy was found in the Library of Congress.

== See also ==
- List of American films of 1908
