= The Story the Biograph Told =

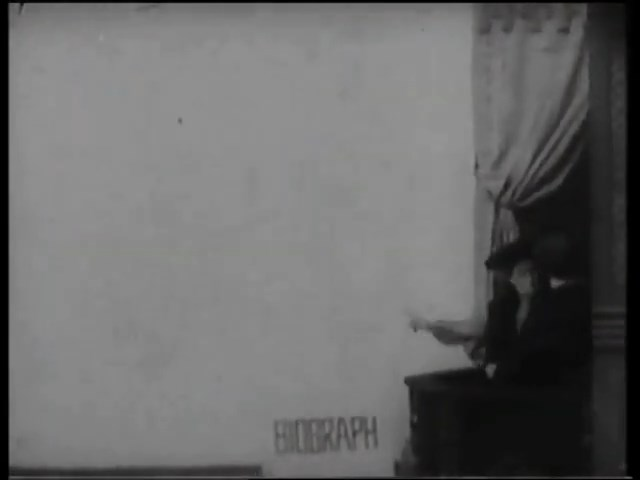
- Directed by: Wallace McCutcheon, Sr.
- Starring: Charles J. Ross; Mabel Fenton
- Cinematography: A.E. Weed
- Distributed by: Biograph Company
- Release date: January 1904
- Running time: 3 minutes
- Country: United States
- Languages: Silent film with English intertitles

The story the Biograph Told, also known as Caught by Moving Pictures, is a 1904 American short silent comedy film directed by Wallace McCutcheon, Sr.

== Plot ==
An office boy at Biograph learns how to operate a camera, and secretly films the boss kissing his secretary. Later, the boss and his wife go to the pictures, and see the kissing scene on the screen. The wife runs out of the theater. The wife replaces the secretary with a young man.

== Cast ==
- Charles J. Ross
- Mabel Fenton

== Preservation and restoration ==
The film was initially catalogued under the title The Story of the Biograph Told making film historians believe that it would be a documentary about early film production at the Biograph Company. It is only when the film was restored in the late 1950s that it turned out that the film was a comedy about infidelity betrayed by filming, and that Biograph in the title referred not to the company but to the filming device used by it.

== Analysis ==
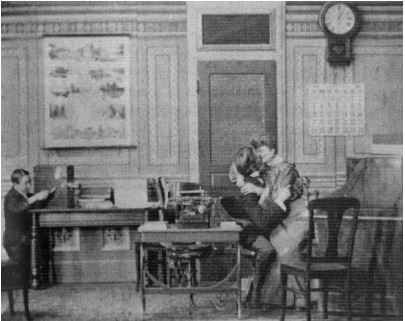
Screenshot

The film is composed of three scenes comprising seven shots filmed by a static camera:

1. Scene 1: Wide shot of the office of a film production company. The director shows an office boy how to use a movie camera. He goes out and a secretary enters. The director comes back and starts dictating a letter. The boy leaves and the director takes his secretary on his lap and starts kissing her without noticing that the young man has come back and is filming the scene.
2. Double exposure showing the same set as 1 and the house of the director. The wife of the director talks to her husband on the telephone while he is still holding his secretary on his lap and the young man is still filming.
3. Same set as 1. Continuation of the action.
4. Scene 2: A cinema theatre. The director and his wife are sitting in a box at the foreground in front of a white screen. A sign is pushed before the screen reading "Ross and Fenton", followed by a sign with the brand Biograph.
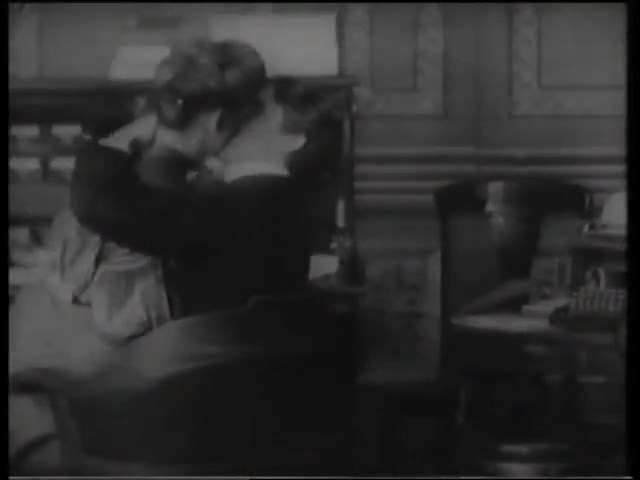
  Screenshot
5. The scene filmed by the office boy during shots 1 to 3 is shown full-screen now seen from the back and as a medium close-up.
6. Same set as 4. The director's wife asks her husband for explanations, hits him and leaves furious.
7. Scene 3: Same set as 1. The director is dictating a letter to his secretary. His wife enters with a young man and forces her husband to fire the secretary and replace her by the man.

Original features of this short film have been highlighted by various commentators, notably the use of a mise en abyme with the film-in-film process involving the filming of a scene by a camera visible on-screen and the later display of the film taken. Tom Gunning mentions it as one of the earliest example of the camera playing an "essential role as the mute yet unassailable witness of a crime." Christian Quendler cites it as the first example of the way in which the dissonances between human perception and camera vision have been the object of playful exploration in early films. He argues that the film "consciously exploits the reconciliation of these dissonances as a means of self-promotion". This is reinforced by the fact that the Biograph brand is displayed on a sign shown in front of the screen before the film starts. Judith Mayne mentions the film as the first example of a new category of films where the storyteller is the photographer or image-maker, also stressing that the action takes place in the office of the Biograph company.

Katherine Manthorne considers this film as an example of the way in which early cinema, with the ubiquitous camera eye, "provided an invaluable source of carnal knowledge, one that was necessarily acquired through its lens." Paul Young mentions it as an example of the early cinema "voracious appetite for the most intimate and embarrassing aspects of the private sphere." He considers that it can be seen as including a "friendly" warning that if the use of camera became widespread, no one's privacy would be safe. He observes indeed that, as the film-in-film is not presented matted into the long shot of the proscenium, as was the case in e.g. The Countryman and the Cinematograph or Uncle Josh at the Moving Picture Show, spectators see the same film as the director. This alignment of the point of view of the audience with that of the director "implies that the viewer could be next - that anyone could be filmed in a compromising position and displayed before a jury of their spectatorial peers."

Noël Burch highlights two innovations introduced by this film in terms of cinematographic language. The first is the filming of a scene from two different angles, or "match with a change in axis". The second, less successful, is an attempt to show at the same time two scenes taking place at two different locations during a telephone call; this was done by superimposition, which made it difficult to distinguish anything. Future films will use split screen for that purpose.
