= The Invisible Fluid =

1908 film by Wallace McCutcheon, Sr.

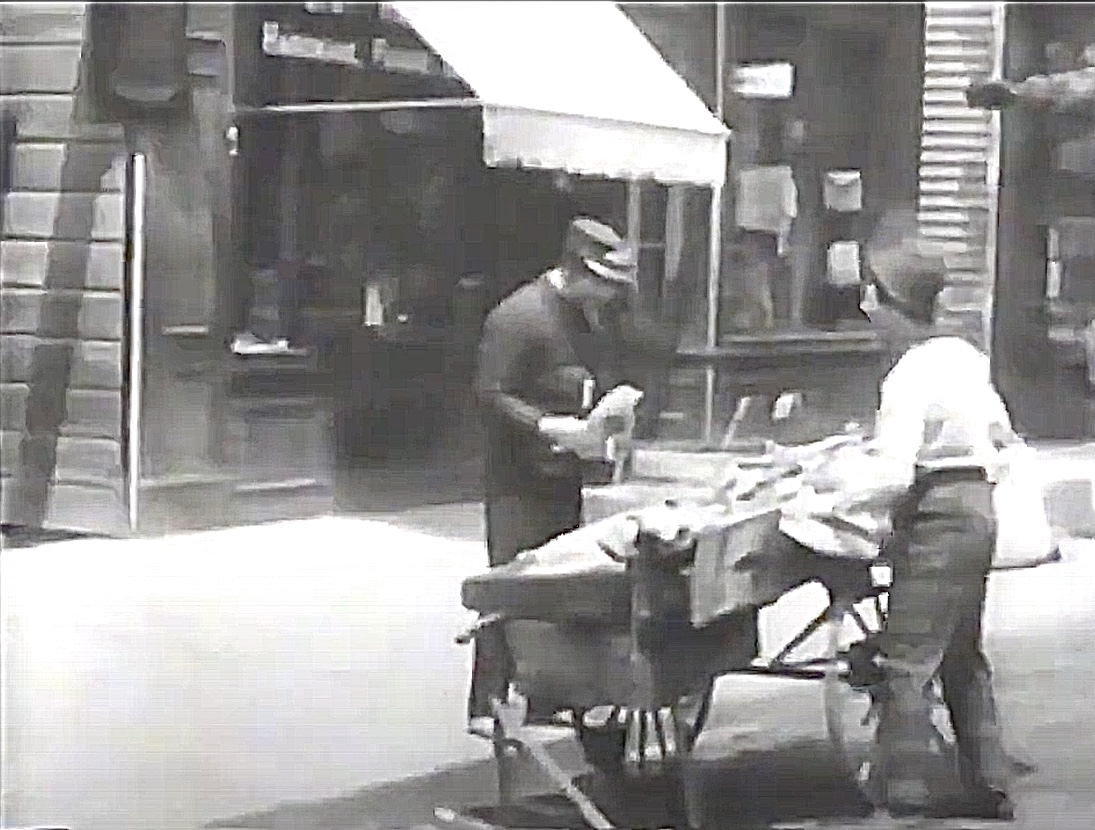
- Film frame of the "Messenger" (left) just before he makes the "Fruit vendor" disappear
- Directed by: Wallace McCutcheon Sr. (Note: Wallace McCutcheon Sr. (c. 1862–1918) should not be confused with his son, Wallace McCutcheon Jr., who also worked as a director at Biograph for a limited time during this period. In some sources, the elder McCutcheon is referred to as the "Old Man" or "George". Refer to pp. 37–39 in Robert M. Henderson's biography D.W. Griffith: His Life and Work cited in greater detail under "References".)
- Produced by: American Mutoscope and Biograph Company (Note: For the first decade of its existence, the American Mutoscope and Biograph Company was most often referred to in print by its full corporate name or by the abbreviations "AM&B" and "AB" for on-screen film credits. By 1908, however, the company was increasingly being cited in publications by a shorter name, simply as "Biograph". Refer to "Slide, Anthony" under this page's references.); New York City
- Starring: Edward Dillon
- Cinematography: G. W. Bitzer
- Distributed by: American Mutoscope and Biograph Company
- Release date: June 16, 1908
- Running time: 9.5 minutes, 662 feet (Note: According to the reference How Movies Work by Bruce F. Kawin (New York: Macmillan Publishing Company, 1987, pp. 46–47), a full 1000-foot reel of film in the silent era had a maximum running time between 15 and 16 minutes. Silent films were generally projected at an average or "standard" speed of 16 frames per second, much slower than the 24 frames of later sound films.)
- Country: United States
- Language: Silent

The Invisible Fluid is a 1908 American silent science fiction comedy film produced by the American Mutoscope and Biograph Company of New York, directed by Wallace McCutcheon Sr., and starring Edward Dillon. (Note: The British Film Institute, as does other motion picture repositories and references, classifies The Invisible Fluid within the genres of both science fiction and comedy.) The short's plot relies extensively on the filming and editing technique of substitution splicing, also known as "stop trick", a special effect that creates the illusion of various characters or objects suddenly vanishing on screen.

Full copies of this trick film, now in the public domain, survive in various formats. Some digital copies are available for viewing on streaming services such as YouTube and at the Internet Archive. Film-stock copies are preserved among the holdings of the Motion Picture, Broadcasting, and Recorded Sound Division at the Library of Congress in Washington, D.C. and in the collection of the British Film Institute in London.

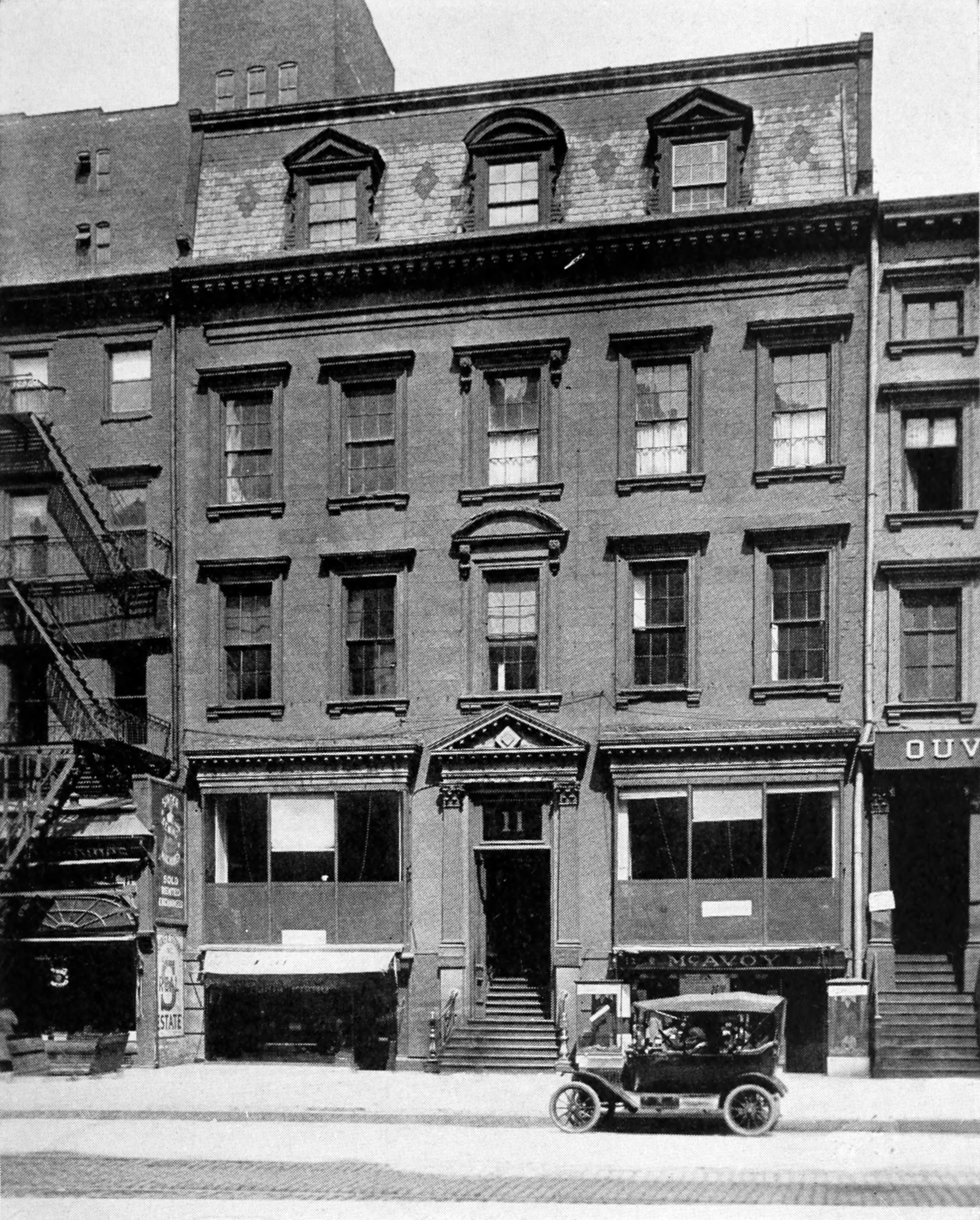
Biograph's Manhattan studio was only a short distance from Grantwood, New Jersey, where the film's outdoor scenes were shot in May 1908.

== Plot ==
The film's storyline centers on a "doltish" young messenger or "errand boy" who manages to obtain a small spray bottle filled with a fluid that when misted directly onto a person or an object causes that individual or item to vanish suddenly and entirely for at least 10 minutes. Initially, the young man simply delights in making people disappear, using the fluid to create panic and confusion by spraying and "erasing" a bridegroom at a wedding, various workers, and pedestrians. Later, at a restaurant, the messenger realizes he can use the concoction for personal financial gain by stealing a cash register. After being chased by an angry mob of the people who had vanished but now have reappeared, he is captured by the police, but the invisible fluid provides him a means to escape.

Another summary of the plot, an even more detailed one, is provided in the June 20, 1909 issue of the New York trade journal The Moving Picture World:

'The Invisible Fluid' (Biograph) – Had the poor melancholy Dane, Hamlet, lived in this, the twentieth century, he would never have given voice to the remark, "Oh, that this too, too solid flesh would melt, thaw and resolve itself into a dew!" No indeed! He would have procured some of the mysterious fluid compounded by an erudite scientist by which things animate and inanimate were rendered non est for ten minutes at least, by simply spraying them with it. In an atomizer, [the scientist] sends a quantity, accompanied by a letter, to his brother, in the hope of his putting it on the market. The brother regards it as a joke, and, while toying with the atomizer, accidentally sprays himself. Presto! he is gone, to the amazement of the messenger boy who has carried the package thither. The boy reads the letter, and at once sees the amount of fun he can get out of it, so he nips it. Strolling along the avenue is a young girl, leading a dog by a chain. Swish! and a dangling chain is all that is left with the girl. Next, a Dago with a fruit stand; first, the fruit stand is made to disappear. then the Dago himself. Two expressmen are lifting a heavy trunk from their wagon when the boy appears. Same result—trunk vamooses, as do the expressmen, with another squirt of the fluid. A wedding party is just leaving church when this young imp comes along. The groom vanishes, and the bride is thrown into hysterics.

Into the park he meanders, and many and ludicrous are the tricks he plays. Finally, he enters a restaurant, and, after almost throwing the place into a panic, goes to pay his check, but, instead, he, with one spray, obliterates the young lady cashier and then steals the cash register. He is now chased by a mob of his victims, who have by this time overcome the influence of the fluid and become reincarnate. Halting on the road, he turns on his pursuers and affects their disappearance one after another as they approach him. A copper steals up from behind, and, taken unawares [sic], he is carried off to the station house. With a policeman on each side of him, he appears before the judge. Picking up the atomizer, he gives it a squeeze and vanishes instantly, leaving the judge and officers dumbfounded. Length, 662 feet.

== Cast ==
- Edward Dillon as the "Messenger", the main character
- D. W. Griffith as the "Mailman" with letter bag
- Mack Sennett as the "Mover", one of the expressmen unloading a crate
- Anthony O'Sullivan as the "Fruit vendor" with a street cart

== Production ==
According to company records cited in the 1985 reference D.W. Griffith and the Biograph Company, this science-fiction comedy was filmed on May 16, 1908, with principal photography—the outdoor scenes—being shot along streets and on parkland in Grantwood, New Jersey. That community is a short distance, just across the Hudson River, from the Manhattan borough of New York City, which in 1908 was home to the American Mutoscope and Biography Company's main studio. Situated inside a converted brownstone mansion at 11 East 14th Street, that studio was Biograph's first indoor studio and where between 1906 and 1913 interior scenes for productions were filmed, including those for The Invisible Fluid.

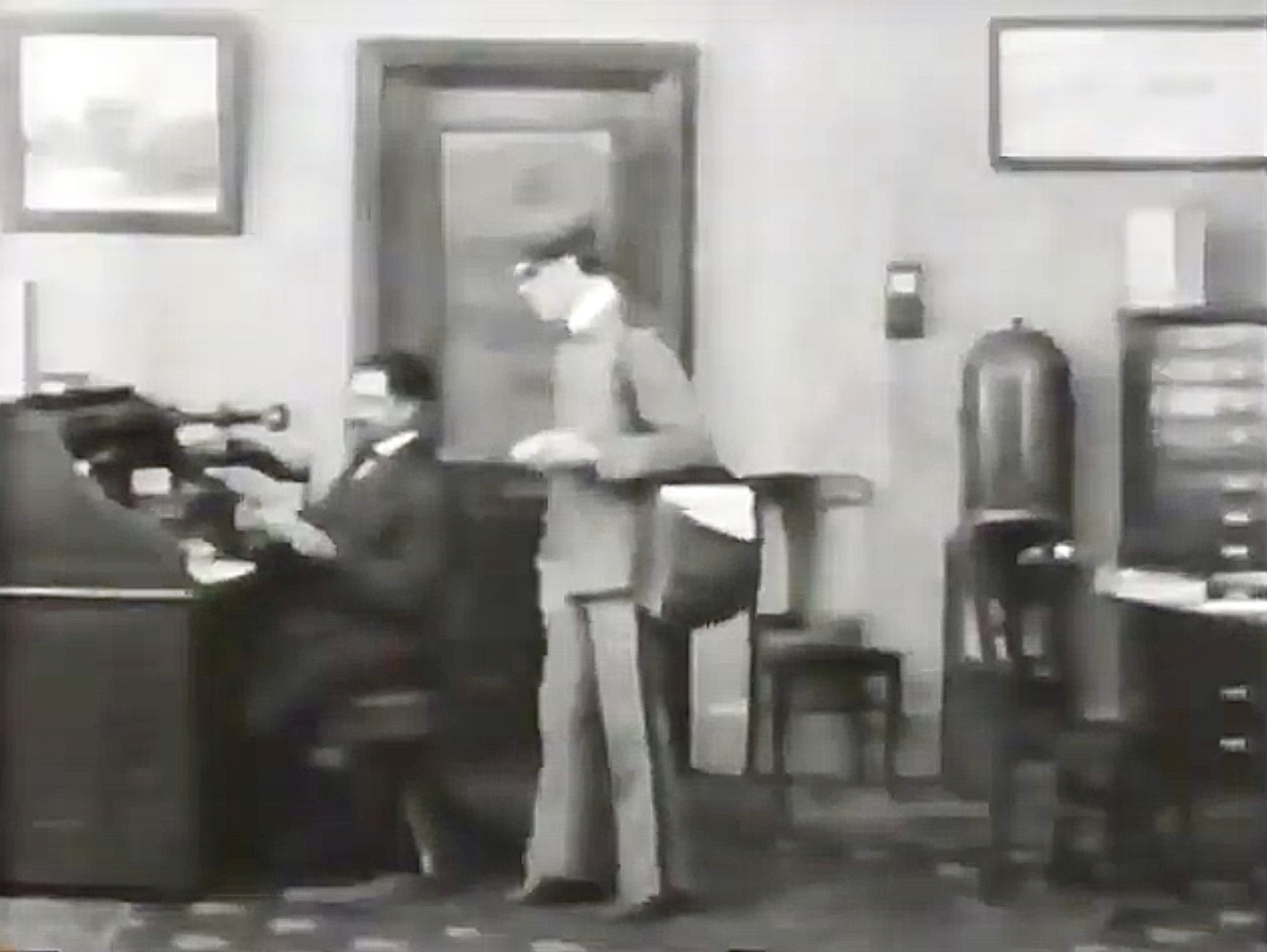
D.W. Griffith (right), known foremost in cinematic history as a director, plays a minor role as a mail carrier in this film's opening scene.

=== Cinematography ===
Company records also credit the filming of this short to Wilhelm ("Billy") Bitzer, who had begun working as a staff cinematographer for Biograph in 1896 and by 1908 was widely regarded "as the greatest camera man in the business". It is noteworthy that the actor portraying the "Mailman" in the opening scene of The Invisible Fluid is D.W. Griffith, who is wearing a postal uniform and carries a letter bag on his shoulder. Just weeks after the filming of this project, Griffith would broaden his duties at Biograph and make his debut as a film director, overseeing the studio's production of the drama short The Adventures of Dollie. Although another company cinematographer, Arthur Marvin, shot that 1908 release, Griffith would soon begin collaborating with Bitzer, who served not only as his chief cameraman on nearly all of Griffith's future projects but also served as Griffith's early mentor, instructing "the novice director" about many aspects of film lighting, scene composition, and editing.

==== "Stop-trick" filming ====
The story and cinematography of The Invisible Fluid rely extensively on the filming and editing technique of substitution splicing to create the illusion of characters in various scenes suddenly disappearing. Also known as the special effect of "stop trick", the technique is often confused today with the term "stop motion" as it applies to the creation of modern animated features. The splicing technique used in this comedy was already a well-established effect by 1908, having been popularized over a decade earlier by French illusionist, actor, and pioneer cinematographer Georges Méliès. Méliès used this splicing method in an array of his early projects, including in his 75-second 1896 film Escamotage d'une dame chez Robert-Houdin (known too by the abbreviated English title The Vanishing Lady). Like many other early motion picture studios in Europe and in the United States, the American Mutoscope and Biograph Company quickly adopted stop-trick effects in its productions. The studio's directors, camera operators, and film editors or "cutters" had begun using the process as early as 1900, portraying on screen the disappearance of a burglar in Biograph's comedy short Sherlock Holmes Baffled.

== Distribution and reception ==
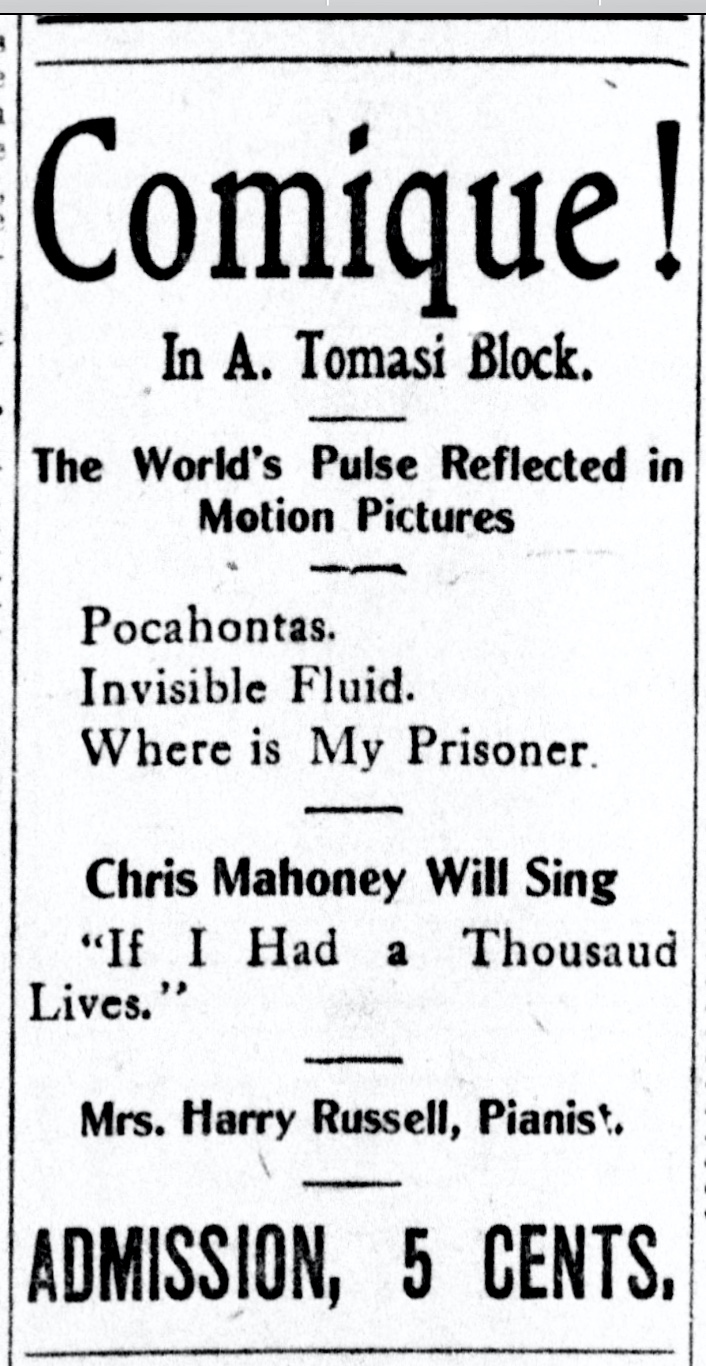
Promotion of "Invisible Fluid" with other films at Comique Theater in Barre, Vermont, October 1908

Remarks about this film published in 1908 newspapers and trade journals are generally quite brief and with few exceptions are connected to advertisements for the Biograph release and to its promotion at various theaters throughout the United States. More than 17 months after the comedy's release, it was still being screened in large and small towns. One of those locations is Pendleton in northeastern Oregon, a community that in 1909 had a population of slightly over 4,400 residents. There on November 13, 1909, the Orpheum Theatre promoted in the local newspaper a diverse entertainment program that was to present that evening The Invisible Fluid as the final film in a lineup of four other shorts, two of which were considerably older than this Biograph release: a crime drama by Edison Studios, The Train Wrecker[s] (1905); the French trick film The Flower Fairy (1905) by Pathé Frères; a documentary short, Steel Industry (1908), produced in England by the Gaumont-British Picture Corporation; and the Western The Tale of Texas (1909) released by the Centaur Film Company.

== Film's preservation status ==
Digital copies reproduced from various sources are available today for viewing online. One copy, for example, is cited as "Invisible Fluid (1908) AM&B" and is available on the streaming service YouTube. Another copy, under the Brazilian Portuguese title O fluido invisibilizador, can be viewed at the free site Internet Archive.

Film-stock copies of The Invisible Fluid survive in the Library of Congress (LOC), which also holds a 255-foot paper roll of contact prints produced directly, frame-by-frame, from Biograph's original nitrate negative footage. (Note: The print of The Invisible Fluid preserved in the Library of Congress is numbered "FLA5494; the negative copy, "FRA2372". Refer to "Niver" cited in greater detail under "References".) Submitted by the studio to the United States government in June 1908, shortly before the film's release, the roll is part of the original documentation required by federal authorities for motion picture companies in their applications to obtain copyright protection for their productions. (Note: The United States Copyright Office officially registered and granted Biograph a copyright for the film (#H111674) on June 11, 1908. Refer again to "Niver" under "References".) While the library's paper roll of the film is certainly not projectable, a negative copy of the roll's paper images was made and transferred onto modern polyester-based safety film stock. From that negative footage a positive print could then be processed for screening. All of these copies were made as part of a preservation project carried out during the 1950s and early 1960s by Kemp R. Niver and other LOC staff, who restored more than 3,000 early paper rolls of film images from the library's collection in order to create safety-stock copies. Among other print and digital copies preserved today is a full 35mm positive copy, one also transferred to safety stock, that is held by the British Film Institute.
