= The Pioneers (1903 film) =

1903 film by Wallace McCutcheon, Sr.

- Directed by: Wallace McCutcheon, Sr.
- Cinematography: Wallace McCutcheon, Sr.
- Production company: American Mutoscope and Biograph Company
- Distributed by: American Mutoscope and Biograph Company
- Release date: October 1903
- Running time: 15 minutes
- Country: United States
- Languages: Silent; English intertitles

The Pioneers is an American silent film and one of the earliest Westerns, having been released by the American Mutoscope and Biograph Company in October 1903. It incorporates part of the footage from Kit Carson, another Western short also released by Biograph in October 1903. Both films were shot on location in the Adirondack Mountains of New York.

== Plot ==
A little girl is captured by a band of Indians and her settler parents killed. Some trappers come upon the bodies and set out in pursuit. They track down and kill all the Indians and free the girl.
