= Kit Carson (1903 film) =

1903 American film

- Cinematography: Wallace McCutcheon, Sr.
- Production company: American Mutoscope and Biograph Company
- Distributed by: American Mutoscope and Biograph Company
- Release date: October 1903
- Running time: 21 minutes
- Country: United States
- Languages: Silent; English intertitles

Kit Carson is one of the earliest Western films, being released by the American Mutoscope and Biograph Company in October 1903. (According to silentera.com, portions may have been released the month before.) Part of the footage was reused in The Pioneers, another Western short also released by Biograph in October 1903. Both films were shot on location in the Adirondack Mountains of New York.

== Plot ==
Kit Carson and another trapper are attacked by Indians in the wilderness; Carson is taken prisoner and his companion killed. He escapes, but is recaptured and taken to his captors' village. There, a maiden takes pity on him and cuts his bonds, enabling him to escape again and return home to his loving family.
