= The Suburbanite =

- The Suburbanite
- Directed by: Wallace McCutcheon
- Written by: Frank Marion
- Starring: John Troiano
- Cinematography: A.E. Weed
- Production company: American Mutoscope & Biograph Company
- Distributed by: American Mutoscope & Biograph Company
- Release date: November 1904
- Running time: 9 minutes
- Country: United States
- Language: Silent

The Suburbanite is a 1904 American short comedy silent film directed by Wallace McCutcheion and starring John Troiano. The film was produced and distributed by the American Mutoscope & Biograph Company. Prints exist in the Library of Congress film archive and in the Museum of Modern Art film archive.

== Plot ==
The film is about a family who move to the suburbs, hoping for a quiet life. Things start to go wrong, and the wife gets violent and starts throwing crockery, leading to her arrest.

== Cast ==
- John Troiano

== Reception ==
Pamela Robertson Wojcik considers the film to be a landmark film for actors, noting that the "comic characters had assumed a more central position in the mise-en-scene", and as a result, the actor's skills were "increasingly called upon to create a rudimentary character".
