= The Bold Bank Robbery =

- Directed by: Jack Frawley
- Story by: Jack Frawley
- Cinematography: Jack Frawley
- Production company: Lubin Manufacturing Company
- Distributed by: Lubin Manufacturing Company
- Release date: July 30, 1904 (United States)
- Running time: 7 minutes
- Country: United States
- Language: Silent

The Bold Bank Robbery is a 1904 short crime film produced and distributed by the Lubin Manufacturing Company. The silent film depicts a group of burglars who plan and execute a successful bank heist. Company employee Jack Frawley was the film's director, also coming up with the story and serving as cinematographer; the cast's identities are unknown. The silent film was the first Lubin Manufacturing Company release to feature an original narrative.

The film was created after the commercial success of the Edwin S. Porter film The Great Train Robbery, and was intended to be similar to it. Released on July 30, 1904, reception was mixed. It is credited with having motivated Porter to direct the film Capture of the "Yegg" Bank Burglars. A print of the seven-minute film, which is now in the public domain, is preserved in the Library of Congress. In 2002, the film was released on DVD as part of a compilation of silent films.

== Plot ==
After learning they are short of money, a group of four robbers decide to execute a bank heist. The four create a plan and hire an unwitting chauffeur to drive them to their location. As soon as they reach an isolated road, the robbers force the chauffeur out of the car, gag him, and throw him into a ditch. The robbers then drive the car to the bank. After entering, they kill a security guard and use explosives to force the bank vault open. The thieves steal as much money as possible and make a quick retreat to their car. Back in the park, a young couple on a walk discover the unconscious body of the chauffeur, and the man calls the police.

The band of robbers, now at home, are about to start splitting their stolen goods equally, when the police barge in. While three of the robbers are subdued after a fight, one manages to make his escape via a window and ends up on the roof. The two policemen chase the criminal, who eludes them by jumping from rooftop to rooftop. After the robber jumps down to the street, he runs toward the railroad station and boards a departing train. The police officers arrive but are too late, as the robber has left. The officers tell the train dispatcher to send a telegram to the next station, informing them of the fugitive and asking them to catch him as soon as possible. When the train reaches the next station, the burglar exits the train and unknowingly runs right into the path of policemen. With all four of the robbers caught, they are sentenced to forty years in jail. While doing work in the jail's quarry, the group review their failure, with each robber pinning the blame on another.

== Production ==
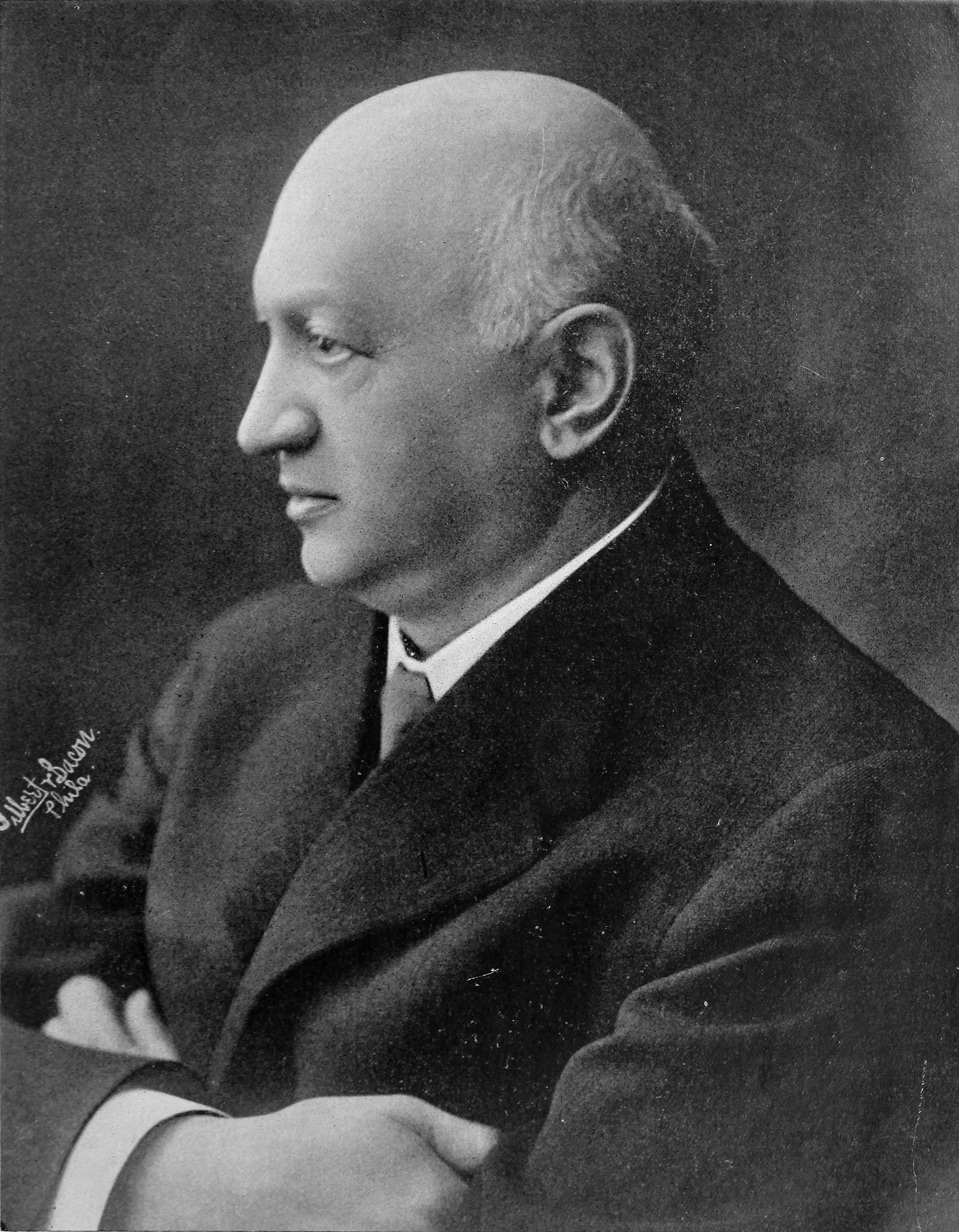
Siegmund Lubin in 1913. His film studio, the Lubin Manufacturing Company, produced and distributed The Bold Bank Robbery.

The Bold Bank Robbery was directed by Jack Frawley and produced by the Lubin Manufacturing Company. Frawley worked at the company, serving as their general manager. He often devised the stories for their films; The Bold Bank Robbery was no exception. The film was the company's first to feature an original narrative.

Frawley, who also served as cinematographer for the film, had a relaxed approach to making films; he did not use screenplays and never numbered the scenes. During the assembling of Frawley's films, the sole material for editors to rely on was a pad with notes scrawled in it. The identities of the cast of The Bold Bank Robbery are unrecorded. The film, silent and shot in black-and-white, was filmed in Philadelphia. It was shot using a camera that company creator Siegmund Lubin had built back in 1901.

The Bold Bank Robbery was inspired by and created after the success of the 1903 western film The Great Train Robbery; other inspirations included American and European crime films. Lubin Manufacturing Company had been known to produce films similar to other popular ones; film historian Kemp R. Niver observed that "if it seemed like a good idea, and other film producers were making money, 'Pop' Lubin simply appropriated the title and remade or duped the motion picture." Siegmund Lubin filed a copyright for the film on July 25, 1904. The finished product comprised 600 feet (182 m) of film.

== Release ==
The Bold Bank Robbery was released on July 30, 1904. Distribution was handled by Lubin Manufacturing Company and the Kleine Optical Company. To promote the film, Siegmund Lubin placed an advertisement in Billboard; appearing in its October 15, 1904 issue, it was the first film to be advertised in the magazine. The advertisement offered the film for purchase at the price of 66 dollars, along with a free Victor Talking Machine if one were to purchase two other films. An advertisement for the film in the New York Clipper declared that The Bold Bank Robbery was "the most sensational film ever made."

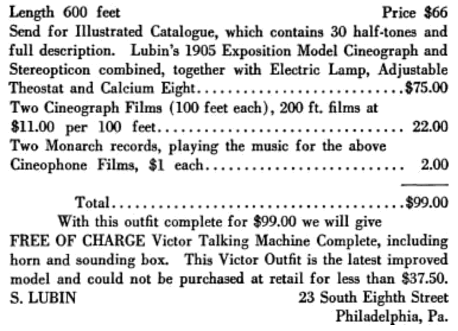
The film's advertisement in Billboard, which marked the first time a film had been promoted in the magazine.

When the film was shown in theaters, it was played alongside a phonograph, a device used to record and replay audio. However, the audio was often not synchronized with the action, perhaps because the projectionists still had to operate the machines by hand. It received a positive review from a writer for the American newspaper The Victoria Advocate, who branded it as a film that "everyone should see." Adversely, author Jay Leyda, writing for Film Quarterly, criticized the film for being "obviously derivative."

In 1904, Edwin S. Porter directed a film entitled Capture of the "Yegg" Bank Burglars, distributed by Edison Studios. Filmed in August and September of that year, the film features a group of robbers who execute a heist. Porter had been motivated to produce it by The Bold Bank Robbery. A man from Belleville, Ontario, who held screenings of The Bold Bank Robbery and paired it with other films in the crime genre, once screened the films at a fair. The man was surprised by the ovation received from the audience, writing that "The applause was something amazing. I really thought the grandstand had collapsed."

The film has survived; a print of The Bold Bank Robbery is preserved in the Library of Congress film archive. In 2002, the film was released on DVD by Kino International as part of The Movies Begin, a DVD boxset which collects 133 silent short films released between 1894 and 1913. The film is now in the public domain.

== Bibliography ==
- Csida, Joseph; Csida, June Bundy (September 1, 1978). American entertainment: a unique history of popular show business. Watson-Guptill Publications. ISBN 9780823075065.
- Eckhardt, Joseph P. (January 1, 1997). The King of the Movies: Film Pioneer Siegmund Lubin. Fairleigh Dickinson Univ Press. ISBN 978-0-8386-3728-9.
- Koopmans, Andy (November 7, 2002). Crime and Criminals. Greenhaven Press. ISBN 978-0-7377-1431-9.
- Musser, Charles (1991). Before the Nickelodeon: Edwin S. Porter and the Edison Manufacturing Company. University of California Press. p. 286. ISBN 978-0-520-06080-7.
- Musser, Charles (1994). The Emergence of Cinema: The American Screen to 1907. University of California Press. ISBN 978-0-520-08533-6.
- Neale, Steve (October 12, 2012). Genre and Hollywood. Routledge. ISBN 978-1-134-97345-3.
- Niver, Kemp R. (1968). The First Twenty Years: A Segment of Film History. Locare Research Group. ISBN 9780913986011.
- Photoplay Magazine Publishing Company (January 1923). Photoplay: The Aristocrat of Motion Picture Magazines. Photoplay Magazine Publishing Company.
- Whitfield, Eileen (2007). Pickford: The Woman Who Made Hollywood. University Press of Kentucky. ISBN 978-0-8131-9179-9.
