= The Cook in Trouble =

- Directed by: Georges Méliès
- Starring: Georges Méliès
- Production company: Star Film Company
- Release date: 1904
- Country: France
- Language: Silent

Sorcellerie culinaire (scène clownesque), released in the US as The Cook in Trouble and in the UK as Cookery Bewitched, is a 1904 French silent trick film directed by Georges Méliès. It was released by Méliès's Star Film Company and is numbered 585–588 in its catalogues.

== Production ==
Méliès plays the cook in the film. Special effects used include pyrotechnics and substitution splices.

The action of the film is a variation on the "trapdoor chase", a type of spectacular chase sequence particularly associated with the Lupino family of performers, including Lupino Lane. In Méliès's version, the trapdoors are designed as openings within the kitchen set: a window, an oven door, a pot, a drawer, and so on. Describing the film for British exhibitors, Charles Urban's film catalogue called the result "acrobatic".

== Reception and survival ==
With its fast-paced antics, designed to build up a hectic visual rhythm rather than to advance a narrative, The Cook in Trouble has been seen as a particularly modernist Méliès film, presaging Dadaism and Surrealism as well as Mack Sennett's chase films. Film historian John Frazer, who praised The Cook in Trouble as "one of the high peaks among the films of Georges Méliès" and compared it with Alfred Jarry's Ubu Roi, commented:

The plot is largely irrelevant, being so encrusted by choreographed acrobatics. More than any other factor it is this bifurcating, simultaneous movement that gives this film its particularly modern feel.

According to the summary in Méliès's American catalogue, The Cook in Trouble originally ended with the cook's clothes being retrieved from the cooking pot; this ending is missing from the surviving copy of the film.
