= The Wonderful Living Fan =

- Directed by: Georges Méliès
- Starring: Georges Méliès
- Production company: Star Film Company
- Release date: 1904
- Country: France
- Language: Silent

The Wonderful Living Fan (French: Le Merveilleux Éventail vivant) is a 1904 French silent trick film by Georges Méliès. It was sold by Méliès's Star Film Company and is numbered 581–584 in its catalogues.

== Production ==
The concept for the living fan is derived from a scene in The Sun Prince, a stage spectacle produced in 1899 at the Théâtre du Châtelet in Paris. Méliès plays the fan maker in the film, which works its tricks using stage machinery, substitution splices, and dissolves. The film's costuming and decor sets the trick in the era of Louis XV.

== Survival and reception ==
Prints of the film survive in several archives, including a hand-colored print at the Cinémathèque Française. A black-and-white print restored by the film preservationist David Shepard was released on home video in 2008.

In a book on Méliès, film historian John Frazer cited The Wonderful Living Fan as "characteristic of Méliès's best fantasy," comparing the arrangement of women on the fan to "a tableau in a Florenz Ziegfeld musical."
