= The Music Master (1908 film) =

Film by Wallace McCutcheon Sr.

- Directed by: Wallace McCutcheon, Sr.
- Written by: D. W. Griffith
- Starring: D. W. Griffith
- Cinematography: G.W. Bitzer
- Production company: American Mutoscope and Biograph Co.
- Distributed by: American Mutoscope and Biograph Co.
- Release date: 1908
- Country: United States

The Music Master is a 1908 American short silent drama film directed by Wallace McCutcheon, Sr. starring D. W. Griffith. It is considered to be a lost film.

== Plot ==
The Music Master tells the story of violinist Herr Von Mitzel (D. W. Griffith) who falls in love with his student, the daughter of an English lord. However, due to the difference in their social status he is unable to marry her.
