= Girls Taking Time Checks =

1904 silent short film

- Produced by: American Mutoscope and Biograph Company; Westinghouse Electric
- Cinematography: G. W. Bitzer
- Distributed by: Biograph Company
- Release date: May 1904
- Running time: 3 minutes
- Country: USA
- Language: Silent..English titles

Girls Taking Time Checks is a 1904 silent actuality film photographed by G. W. Bitzer for the Biograph Company in conjunction with Westinghouse Electric & Manufacturing Company. It was released by the Biograph Company.

== Synopsis ==
An endless stream of young women stream out of the Westinghouse factory taking their time checks. (#note: as this is 1904 the film was more than likely filmed at the Westinghouse Lamp Plant in Bloomfield, New Jersey)
