= The "Teddy" Bears =

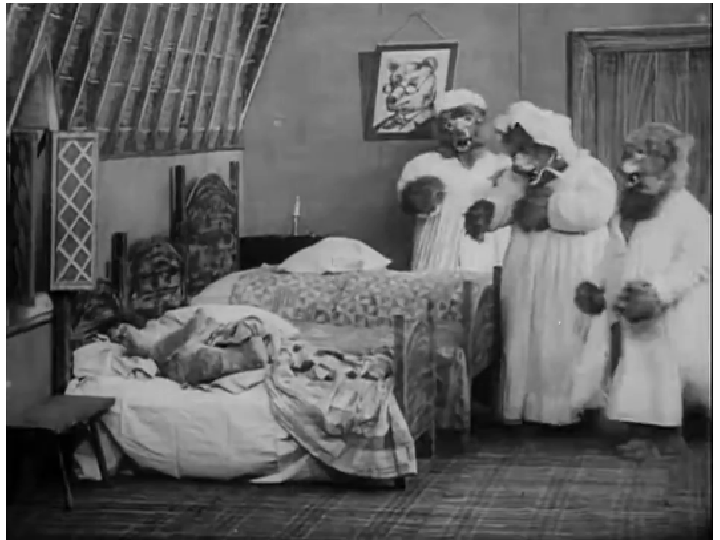
- Directed by: Wallace McCutcheon; Edwin S. Porter
- Cinematography: Edwin S. Porter
- Production company: Edison Manufacturing Company
- Release date: 2 March 1907
- Running time: 13 minutes
- Country: United States
- Language: Silent film

The full film

The "Teddy" Bears is a 1907 American silent film directed by Edwin S. Porter and Wallace McCutcheon, and produced by the Edison Manufacturing Company starting as the fairy tale Goldilocks and ending as a political satire of United States President Theodore Roosevelt.

== Plot summary ==
The film starts as an adaptation of "Goldilocks and the Three Bears". A young girl enters the bears' house, eats their porridge, and sleeps in the bed of the bear cub. When the bears come home and discover her, she jumps out of the window and runs away with one of the bear cub's teddy bears. The bears chase Goldilocks across a snowy landscape until a hunter looking like "Teddy" Roosevelt intervenes, kills the two full-grown pursuers, and captures the bear cub. The hunter and the girl then go back to the bears' house, where they steal the remaining teddy bears.

== Analysis ==
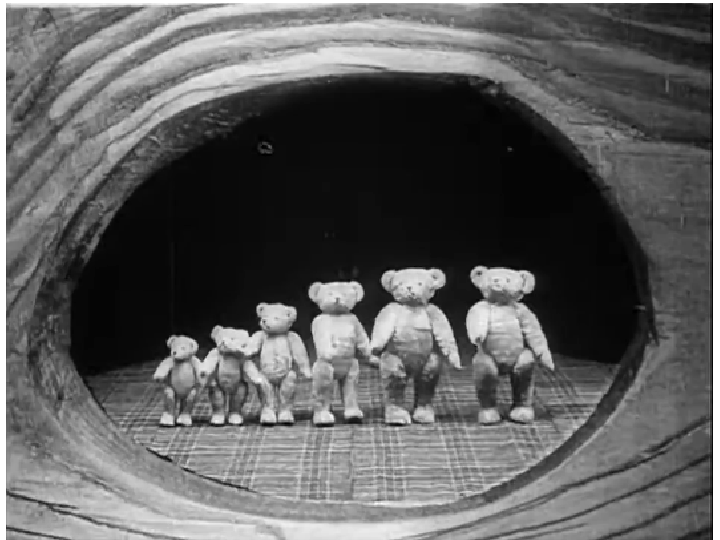
Stop-motion scene

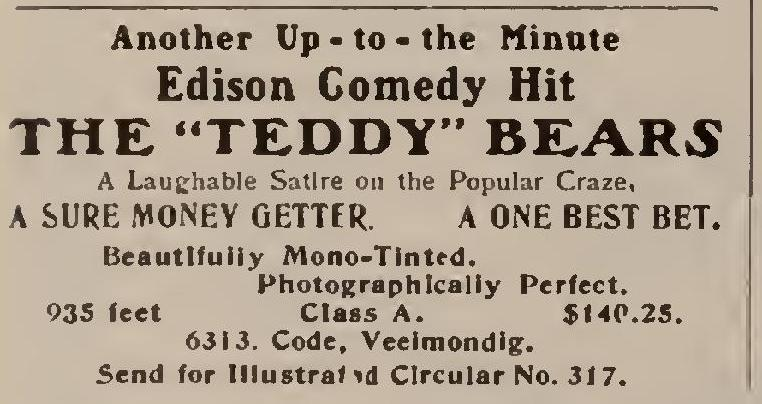
Ad in The Moving Picture World, 1907

The film is composed of 18 shots without any intertitles. The 11 first shots are fixed camera, full shots of studio sets showing the front and various rooms of the bears' house. They are interrupted by one shot showing an elaborated stop-motion animation of six model bears, a scene which took a whole week to film. The next four shots belong to the chase movie genre. They are wide shots filmed on location in a snowy forest with small camera movements and are linked by continuity editing. The final shot uses the same studio set of the bear house front as the opening shot.

This film was one of Edwin Porter's personal favourites. Scott Simmon described it as part "charming fairy tale, part violent political satire and part accomplished puppet animation."

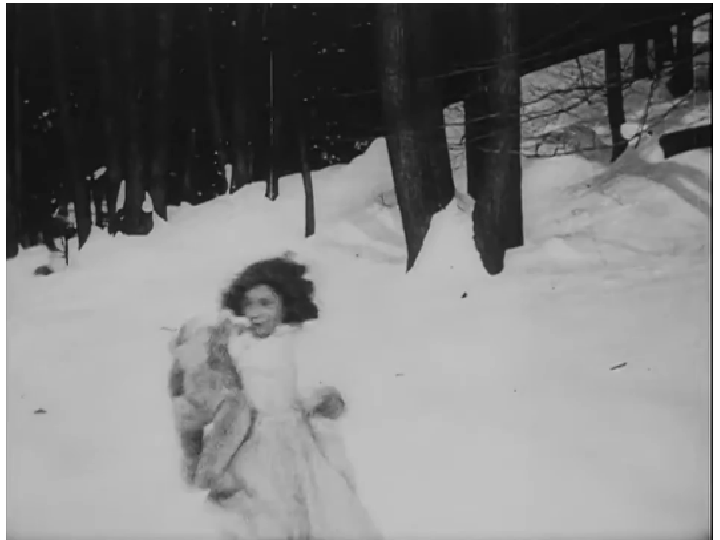
The girl running away with the teddy bear
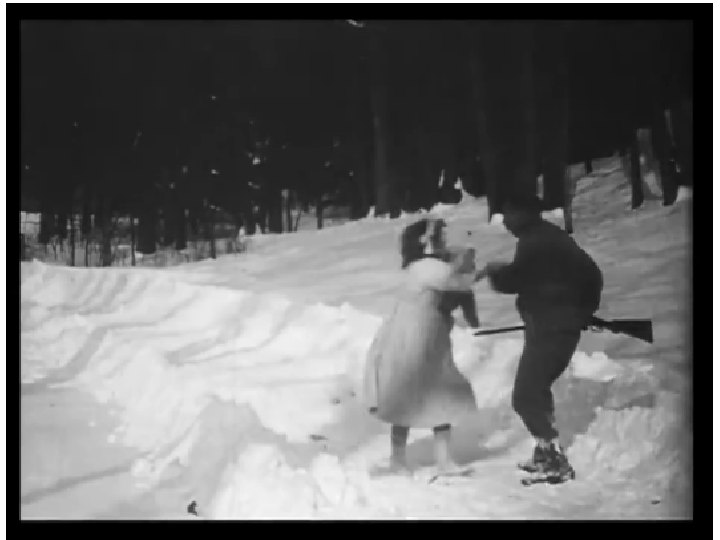
The girl meeting the figure in Roosevelt military attire

However, at the time of release, the change of nature of the film towards the end was regarded as quite unsettling. Sime Silverman wrote in Variety: "The Teddy Bears (...) is made enjoyable through the mechanical acrobatic antics of fluffy haired hand-made animals. The closing pictures showing the pursuit of the child by the bear family is spoiled through a hunter appearing on the scene and shooting two. Children will rebel against this position (...) the live bears seemed so domesticated that the deliberate murder in an obviously "faked" series left a wrong taste of the picture as a whole." Musser notes that not everyone agreed with Sime Silverman. He recalls that the film was advertised as "a laughable satire on a popular craze" and that a large public would have understood the reference to Teddy Roosevelt which was based on the well-known November 1902 incident which had led to the use of Teddy Bear to designate stuffed bears for children. Edwin Porter had already directed a burlesque on Teddy Roosevelt in 1902 Terrible Teddy, the Grizzly King, which was advertised at the time as "a burlesque of Theodore Roosevelt hunting mountain lions in Colorado. Musser remarks that The "Teddy" Bears was not simply a children's film, but was also aimed, like Lewis Carroll's 1865 novel Alice in Wonderland, at adults.

Morgan concludes that "what begins as fairy tale ends with a rather grim and adult mix of satire, topical reference (to the president hunting in Mississippi), and realism. Something of this ambivalence, between the comic and the serious, between TR as harmless caricature and as a more threatening warrior figure, has remained a pattern in representations of him."

The film is also an early example of cinema used as an advertising tool. It was included by marketing pioneer John Wanamaker in the holiday program for Christmas shoppers in his stores to incite customers to buy teddy bears.

== See also ==
- Edwin S. Porter filmography
