= The Moonshiner (film) =

The Moonshiner (1904)
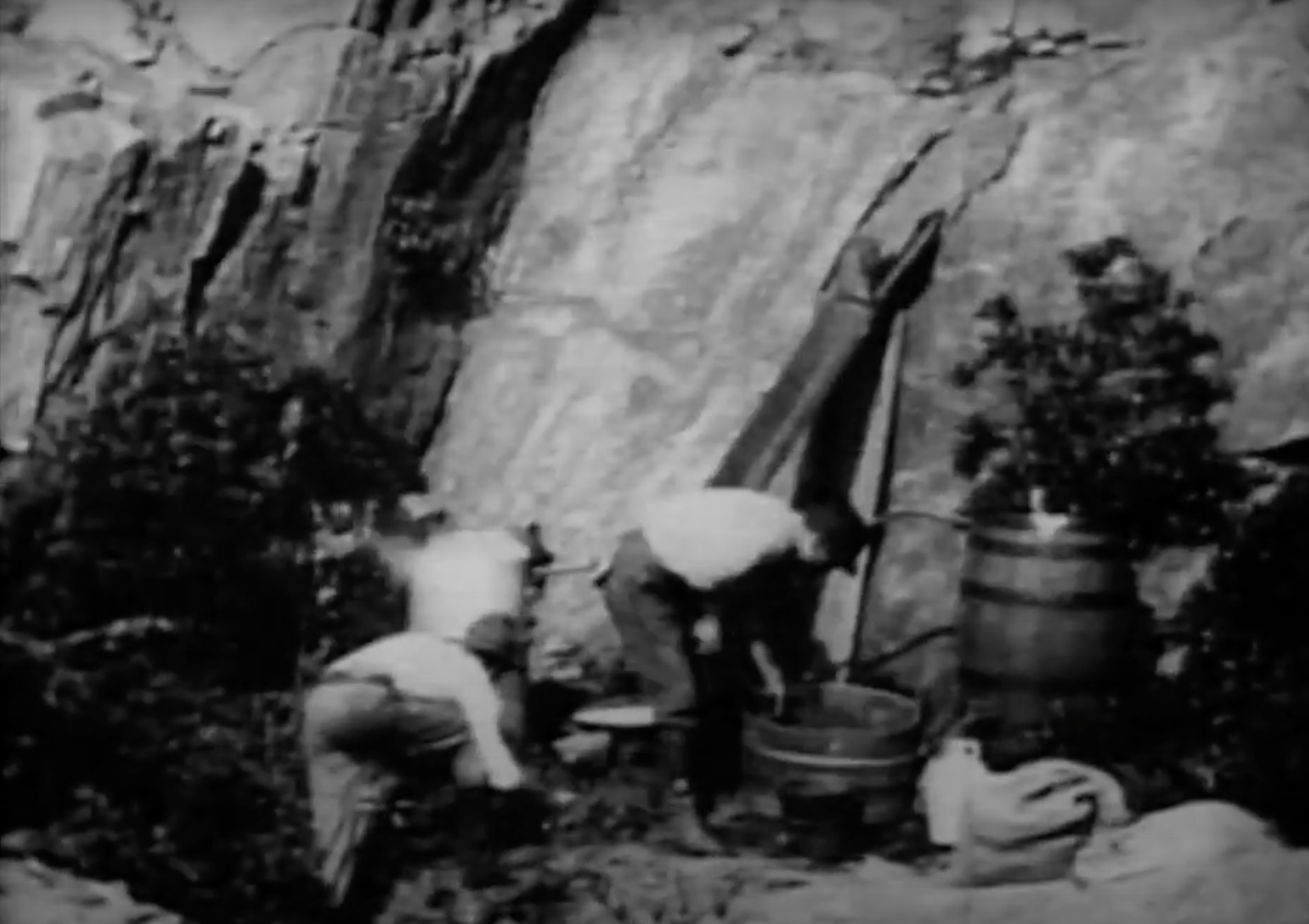
- Moonshiners working at the still
- Directed by: Wallace McCutcheon, Sr.
- Cinematography: G.W. Bitzer
- Distributed by: Biograph Company
- Release date: 1904
- Running time: 13 minutes
- Country: United States
- Languages: Silent film with English intertitles

The Moonshiner is a 1904 American short silent action film produced by the American Mutoscope & Biograph Company and directed by Wallace McCutcheon, Sr.

== Plot ==
A family of moonshiners load several jugs of illicit whiskey onto a horse-drawn wagon. They leave to make a sale. A government agent observes their departure and heads after them on horseback. The agent observes the family trading the moonshine for corn, thus securing the evidence. The agent heads back to notify his colleagues, and they all leave to make the arrest. Meanwhile, the moonshiners go to work on their still.

The lookout is ambushed and apprehended by the government agents, who then engage in a gunfight with the two outlaws operating the still. One of the outlaws is killed and the other flees, only to be shot by another agent. In retribution, the outlaw's wife kills the agent. The final scene shows the outlaw dying in his wife's arms; The final intertitle reads "The Law Vindicated."

== Production and distribution ==
The film was filmed on location in Scarsdale, New York in June and July 1904. It was produced and distributed by the American Mutoscope & Biograph Company. The film was produced with intertitles, which became standard on subsequent Biograph films.

== Analysis ==
The film has been mentioned as an example of the "story films" produced by Biograph in the early 1900s, which allowed this company to overtake the Edison Company as "America's foremost motion picture producer". These types of films helped usher in the "Nickelodeon Era" (c. 1905-1915), a period of rapid expansion of small storefront movie theaters.
