= Tchin-Chao, the Chinese Conjurer =

- Directed by: Georges Méliès
- Starring: Georges Méliès
- Production company: Star Film Company
- Release date: 1904
- Country: France
- Language: Silent

Le Thaumaturge chinois, sold in the United States as Tchin-Chao, the Chinese Conjurer and in Britain as The Chinese Juggler, is a 1904 French silent trick film by Georges Méliès. It was sold by Méliès's Star Film Company and is numbered 578–580 in its catalogues.

Méliès plays the conjurer of the title; his tricks are worked using substitution splices and dissolves. The motion in the film is noticeably fast, even at silent-film speeds such as 16 frames per second; Méliès may have had his camera operator deliberately undercrank the camera to create a stylized effect.
