= The Lost Child (1904 film) =

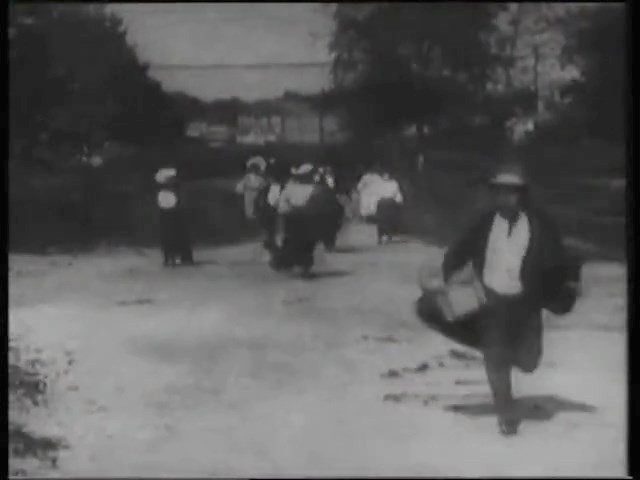
- Directed by: Wallace McCutcheon, Sr.
- Starring: Kathryn Osterman
- Cinematography: G.W. Bitzer
- Distributed by: Biograph Company
- Release date: 1904
- Running time: 7 minutes
- Country: United States
- Languages: Silent film with English intertitles

The Lost Child is a 1904 American short silent comedy film produced by the American Mutoscope & Biograph Company and directed by Wallace McCutcheon, Sr.

== Plot ==
The Lost Child (1904)

A mother sets down her child in the front yard and goes back into the house for a brief moment. As soon as she is gone, the child walks into the doghouse. When the mother comes back outside, she does not see where the child has gone, and when she sees a man in the street with a basket, she runs after him. Soon she has the whole neighborhood in turmoil.

== Cast ==
- Kathryn Osterman

== Production and Distribution ==
The film was entirely filmed on location in Brooklyn, New-York, notably in Fort Hamilton. It was allegedly based on a recent incident of the era. It was produced and distributed by the American Mutoscope & Biograph Company.

John L. Fell reports that in November 1904, The Mirror applauded The Lost Child as a remarkable picture.

== Analysis ==
The film is composed of 11 shots forming one single scene:

1. The front of a house with a doghouse. A woman comes out and sits her baby on the ground. As soon as she has left, he stands up and walks into the doghouse. When the mother comes back she can't find him. The camera pans left as she goes out of the garden out into the street where she sees a man with a basket. She tries to catch him but he runs away. Two maids come out of the house and run with her after the man. They exit to the right after having turned the corner.

2. Two women walk away from the camera on a suburban street, they pass a lady with a pram. The man seen in shot 1 appears at the corner of the street and runs towards the camera chased by the three women, a man in a wheelchair, the lady with the pram and a policeman.

3. Two women and a child are sitting next to a haystack. The group of people running appears at the back and runs towards the camera. The man hides behind the haystack. The group runs past him but comes back and chases him anew.

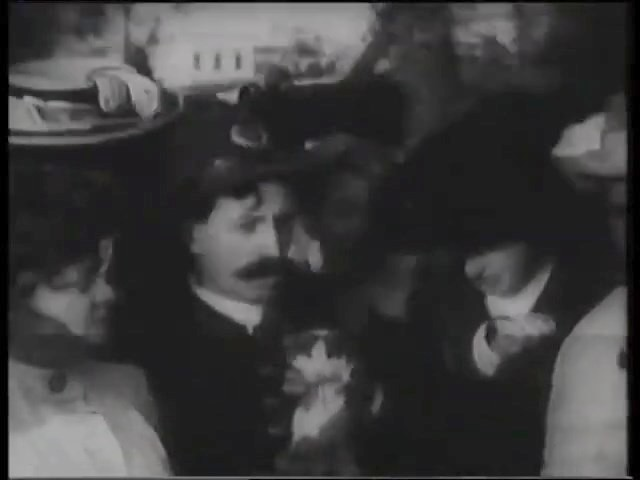
Screenshot

4. A road crossing. The group which now include a man with a wheel cart and another with a wheelbarrow continue chasing the man.

5. A sandy knoll. The man tumbles down the slope, followed by all his pursuers. The camera pans right.

6. The chase continues on a road.

7. On a shady alley, the man hides behind a tree. Most of the group pass him but he is finally spotted and caught.

8. Medium close-up of the man opening his bag and showing he is only carrying a pet.

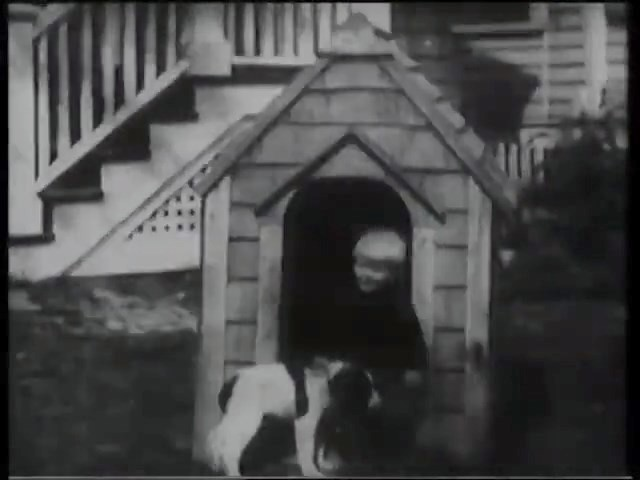
Screenshot

9. Continuation of shot 7, everybody leaves.

10. Medium shot of the doghouse seen in shot 1. The baby pats a dog.

11. The group is walking towards the camera on the street seen in shot 1. The mother enters the garden with part of the group of pursuers and the camera pans to the right as they walk towards the doghouse where the mother finds her baby and hold him in her arms.

The Lost Child has been singled out by several commentators as one of the most interesting early American chase films, possibly inspired by earlier British film such as Desperate Poaching Affray. Joyce E. Jesionowski mentions it as one of the best chase films made by the Biograph Company before the arrival of D.W. Griffith, showing "a firm grasp of continuity cutting" and where "the chase is not a device that hypes the joke, it is the vehicle of the joke." She furthers refers to the film as a "good example of pre-Griffith accumulation chase" where the distraught mother is joined by a line of heteroclit pursuers and where "activity is extended from background to foreground to exploit the spatial extent of the frame." Finally she stresses the contribution of cinematographer Billy Bitzer in producing a "smooth passage of action from shot to shot."

Frank Krutnik and Steve Neale mention The Lost Child as an example of the fact that in 1904, chase was a key device in the cinema, because it "marked the increasing length of films at this time and allowed them to move in the direction of edited narration, articulating one particular kind of narrative action across a variety of shots, locations, and spaces". The chase was at the time "the narration par excellence" and also constituted "a new kind of slapstick attraction". While in later films chases would be incorporated into a wider narrative, here it is the subject of the film, eight shots out of eleven being "devoted to the chase and the capture of the supposed culprit."
