= Wallace McCutcheon Sr. =

American film director

Wallace McCutcheon Sr. (New York City, 1858 or 1862 – Brooklyn, New York, October 3, 1918) was a pioneer cinematographer and director in the early American motion picture industry, working with the American Mutoscope & Biograph, Edison and American Star Film companies. McCutcheon's wealth of credits are often mixed up with the small handful of films directed by his son, Wallace McCutcheon Jr. (1884–1928).

== Biography ==
Referred to affectionately as "Old Man" McCutcheon by members of the Biograph stock company, by 1907 he was indeed one of the senior figures in American film production. Little is known of his background, but he had apparently moved into the early film industry from stage direction. Under the encouragement of his friend Frank Marion, McCutcheon began working as a supervisor and director for American Mutoscope in 1897, continuing with them after their reorganization as American Mutoscope & Biograph in 1899. By the time he left Biograph for Edison in May 1905, McCutcheon had directed, or contributed to, most of the significant, story-driven films that Biograph had made to that time: The Escaped Lunatic (1903), The Story the Biograph Told (1904), Personal (1904), Tom, Tom the Piper's Son (1905) and The Nihilist (1905) among them. At Edison, McCutcheon collaborated with Edwin S. Porter, working on such films as The Night Before Christmas, The Dream of a Rarebit Fiend (1906) and The "Teddy" Bears (1907). According to Charles Musser, McCutcheon was passed up for a raise, and late in 1907 returned to Biograph, where in a short second stretch with the company he made The Sculptor's Nightmare (1908) and Bobby's Kodak (1908) among others. Early in 1908, McCutcheon took seriously ill and was replaced in his position at Biograph by his son, Wallace McCutcheon Jr., nicknamed "Wally." The younger McCutcheon did such a poor job that he was replaced by newcomer D.W. Griffith, whose success was so immediate that Biograph saw no need to bring either McCutcheon back into the fold.

The elder McCutcheon accepted a position as director with the Star Films unit in Fort Lee, N.J.; this was a division of the French Méliès company headed by Gaston Méliès, Georges Méliès' older brother. When the company went westward to San Antonio, Texas in 1910, McCutcheon went with them, but his trail goes cold shortly afterward. McCutcheon simply disappears from credits and other historical markers; it is said that he simply never truly recovered from the illness in 1908, and likely died in Texas not long after the Star Film Company arrived there, but there is no record of it.

Although awarded numerous cinematography credits in various sources—including the Biograph ledgers—McCutcheon's acknowledged strength was in setting up scenes and handling actors, which is what Porter was looking for when McCutcheon was hired by the Edison Company. In his first Biograph period, McCutcheon worked most closely with cameraman A.E. Weed and collaborated with Frank Marion on scenario writing.

== Legacy ==
Although McCutcheon remains little known, especially in comparison to such titans as Porter and Griffith, his work is very well represented in the Paper Print Collection at the Library of Congress. McCutcheon was responsible for a number of films notable for innovative camerawork, early story-telling vehicles, the first comedy "chase" films and a small measure of work in animation. The Pioneers and Kit Carson (both 1903) were early, multi-shot story films and perhaps the first actual Westerns in American film, released only a month or two before Porter's The Great Train Robbery. Biograph's decision to market the individual scenes from these films as Mutoscope subjects may have diluted their impact, and it is possible that the two titles may have shared some scenes, as both dealt with the life of Kit Carson. Personal (1904) was a major breakthrough both artistically and commercially; it is the earliest American "chase" film and was copied by the Edison Company, among others. Some, such as Tom, Tom the Piper's Son, are highly cluttered and static, and McCutcheon seems to have seldom seen the need to depart from the proscenium arch, shot after shot, technique observed by very early filmmakers. Other films, such as The Nihilist (1905) are more creative and mix indoor sets with outdoor views with a more complex construction of the image. The Nihilist also deals with an unusual theme in early American cinema with the sympathetic view that it takes with respect to the Nihilist movement in the Russian Empire. Experimental filmmaker Ken Jacobs paid homage to McCutcheon in his 1969 film Tom, Tom the Piper's Son which used McCutcheon's film as the basis for a fanciful, original creation.

== Problems of attribution ==
Wallace "Wally" McCutcheon Jr. seems to have joined the Biograph company early in 1908, and this has led to a number of difficulties in properly attributing the very late titles credited to McCutcheon Sr. in his brief, second Biograph stint. Both men were logged in the Biograph books as "Wallace McCutcheon" without any further distinction, though the younger McCutcheon worked both as an actor and director, coming to the movies from the stage, like his father had done. Some distinguishing characteristics are evident in Biograph films that may still be viewed, as "Wally" McCutcheon's films are notable for their bad scenarios, inept handling of actors and overall poor quality; certainly titles as King of the Cannibal Islands (1908) and Over the Hills to the Poorhouse (1908) cannot be attributed to the elder McCutcheon. While it is believed that Wally McCutcheon helmed about 8-12 Biographs before he was finally fired, it is not known exactly which titles those were, and this figure may or may not include films such as The Fight For Freedom (1908), apparently begun by Wally McCutcheon, but finished by D.W. Griffith.

Wallace McCutcheon Sr. is also credited with buying the first scenario that Griffith successfully submitted to Biograph, titled "When Knighthood was in Flower." As Biograph never produced a film by this title, it seems that McCutcheon did not direct it, and that the scenario was directed by Griffith himself later in 1908 as When Knights Were Bold.

== Partial filmography ==
How they rob men in Chicago (1902)

The Suburbanite (1904)

The Black Hand (1906)

The Sculptor's Nightmare (1908)

The Black Viper

- The Fastest Wrecking Crew in the World (1897)
- The X-Ray Mirror (1899)
- The Pioneers (1903)
- Kit Carson (1903)
- Boat Race (1904; with Billy Bitzer)
- The Story the Biograph Told (1904)
- The Escaped Lunatic (1904)
- Personal (1904)
- The Moonshiner (1904)
- The Widow and the Only Man (1904)
- The Lost Child (1904)
- The Chicken Thief (1904)
- The Suburbanite (1904) (unconfirmed)
- Panorama from Times Building (1905)
- The Nihilist (1905)
- Tom Tom the Piper's Son (1905)
- The Whole Dam Family and the Dam Dog (1905; with Edwin S. Porter)
- The White Caps (1905; with Edwin S. Porter)
- The Watermelon Patch (1905; with Edwin S. Porter)
- The Miller's Daughter (1905; with Edwin S. Porter)
- The Train Wreckers (1905; with Edwin S. Porter)
- The Life of an American Policeman (1905; with Edwin S. Porter)
- Police Chasing Scorching Auto (1905; with Edwin S. Porter)
- The Night Before Christmas (1905; with Edwin S. Porter)
- Dream of a Rarebit Fiend (1906; with Edwin S. Porter, Video on YouTube)
- Three American Beauties (1906; with Edwin S. Porter)
- The Black Hand (1906)
- A Winter Straw Ride (1906; with Edwin S. Porter)
- The Terrible Kids (1906; with Edwin S. Porter)
- Kathleen Mavourneen (1906; with Edwin S. Porter)
- Getting Evidence (1906; with Edwin S. Porter)
- Daniel Boone, or Pioneer Days in America (1907; with Edwin S. Porter)
- Dr. Skinum (1907)
- Love Microbe (1907)
- The "Teddy" Bears (1907; with Edwin S. Porter)
- The Kentuckian (1908)
- The Sculptor's Nightmare (1908)
- When Knights Were Bold (1908)
- Bobby's Kodak (1908)
- Energizer (1908)
- The Invisible Fluid (1908)
- Old Isaacs, the Pawnbroker (1908)
- The Music Master (1908)
- The Stolen Wireless (1909)

== Sources ==
- Charles Musser, Before the nickelodeon: Edwin S. Porter and the Edison Manufacturing Company, University of California Press, 1991, ISBN 0-520-06986-2, ISBN 978-0-520-06986-2
