= Frank J. Marion =

American film executive (1869–1963)

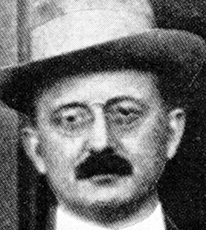
- Born: Frank Joseph Marion; July 25, 1869; Tidioute, Pennsylvania, U.S.
- Died: March 28, 1963 (aged 93); Stamford, Connecticut, U.S.
- Education: Syracuse University
- Occupation: motion picture pioneer
- Known for: Kalem Company
- Spouse: Florence Hall (m. 1897)
- Children: 5

Frank Joseph Marion (July 25, 1869 – March 28, 1963) was an American motion picture pioneer.

== Personal life ==
Marion was born in Tidioute, Pennsylvania. He graduated from Syracuse University in 1890. At Syracuse, he was involved in student journalism on campus and the fraternity Delta Kappa Epsilon. He would later serve as a trustee of the university for over 50 years.

Marion married Florence Hall in 1897. They had 4 daughters and a son. They were married until her death.

== Career ==
At the turn of the 20th century when the film industry was still in its infancy, Marion was employed at Biograph Studios in New York City as a sales manager as well as a screenwriter in collaboration with head writer Wallace McCutcheon. In 1907, Marion along with Biograph production manager Samuel Long, left the company to form their own film production business. Needing capital, they obtained financial backing from wealthy Chicago businessman and film distributor, George Kleine. Using their last name initials KLM, they called their new venture the Kalem Company.

Immediately successful, Marion proved to be an innovator and a businessman with a social conscience when he raised actor's wages to five dollars a day, thereby forcing the rest of the industry to follow suit. The Kalem company achieved a first in the film industry when, upon the urging of Gene Gauntier, who had brought the company success with the Girl Spy serial films in which she had starred, Marion sent Gauntier, director Sidney Olcott and a crew to Ireland in 1910 to make A Lad From Old Ireland, the first ever U.S. motion picture to be shot on location outside of the United States.

Two years later, Marion sent Olcott's crew to Palestine where they filmed From the Manger to the Cross (1912). In 1998, this film was selected for the National Film Registry of the United States Library of Congress. In November 1917, given his experience in the film industry, Marion was appointed to be the director of the offices the Committee on Public Information created in Spain and Italy.

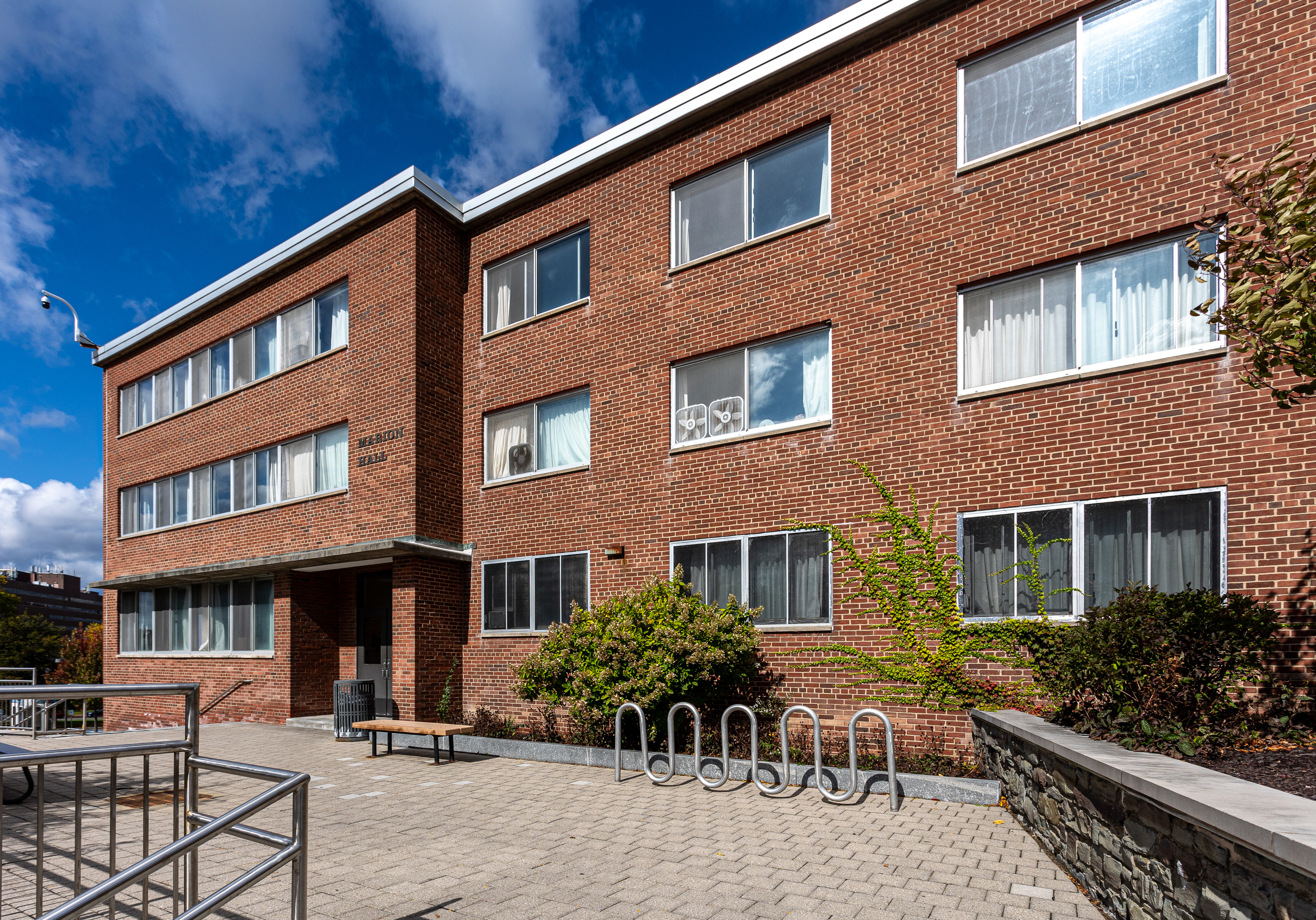
Marion Hall at Syracuse University

After ten years in business, the Kalem Company was sold to Vitagraph Studios and Marion became part of Vitagraph management. In 1913, he donated funds to establish a photography building at his alma mater, Syracuse University. The Marion residence hall, constructed in 1954, is named after him.

== Selected filmography ==
- The Country Doctor (1927)

== Death ==
Frank Marion died in 1963 in Stamford, Connecticut, aged 93.
