= The Widow and the Only Man =

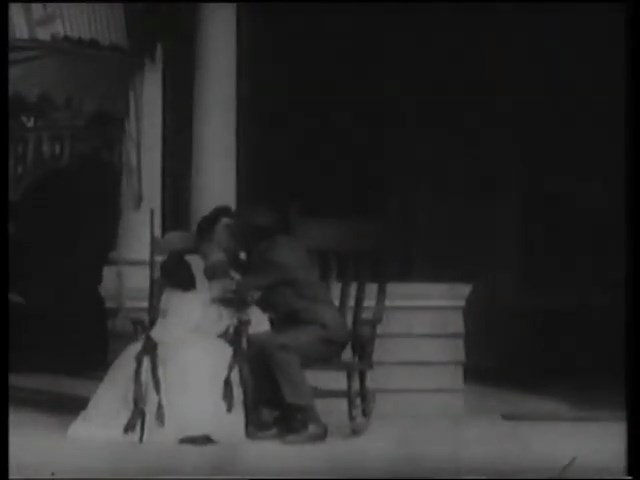
- Directed by: Wallace McCutcheon, Sr.
- Cinematography: G.W. Bitzer
- Distributed by: Biograph Company
- Release date: 1904
- Running time: 9 minutes
- Country: United States
- Languages: Silent film with English intertitles

The Widow and the Only Man is a 1904 American short silent comedy film produced by the American Mutoscope & Biograph Company and directed by Wallace McCutcheon, Sr.

== Plot ==
A group of women are sitting on the veranda of a resort hotel. First the woman arrives, and later the man. The film then shows their friendship progressing as they dine together, ride in a carriage together, and boat together.

When they are boating, the boat turns over, and the man rescues the widow. A later scene shows a box of flowers being delivered to the widow. The camera moves in to a close-up of the woman as she admires each flower and then moves back out to show the arrival of her suitor.

The denouement takes place later in a dry goods store. The widow walks in and promptly faints when she discovers that the ribbon clerk is none other than her gallant summer beau.

== Production and distribution ==
The film was filmed on location in Brooklyn, and Coney Island on 9 and 11 August 1904. It was released on 8 September 1904. It was produced and distributed by the American Mutoscope & Biograph Company.

== Analysis ==
The film is composed of 12 shots and four intertitles. The two first intertitles introduce the protagonists as The Only Man and The Widow, and are followed by two medium close-ups. The two other intertitles divide the film in two parts: The Episode, composed of 9 shots and Back to the Ribbon Counter which includes only one shot. All these shots are wide shots, some with camera panning, with the exception of shot 8 showing a close-up of the widow "as she inspects some flowers sent to her by the hero".

The Episode

1. A group of women are sitting down on a veranda and talking excitedly. One of the women looks through a pair of binoculars and gesticulates excitedly. A man arrives and a hotel clerk takes his luggage and they both come in.

2. Another angle showing the veranda. A motor car arrives, bringing three women.

3. Another view of the veranda. The man is playing the banjo as he surrounded by all the women. The widow enters and sits down.

4. Same view as Episode 2. A woman and her daughter leave on a carriage, followed by the man and the widow in another carriage.

5. Another view of the veranda. The man and the widow are sitting alone. He kisses her.

6. The beach. A maid takes off the shoes and the bathrobe of the lady next to a rowing boat. The man pulls the boat afloat and they row away. The camera pans to follow them. The boat capsizes. The man swims ashore with the lady.

7. The widow's bedroom. The maid brings a box of flowers to the widow, who is sitting in an easy chair.

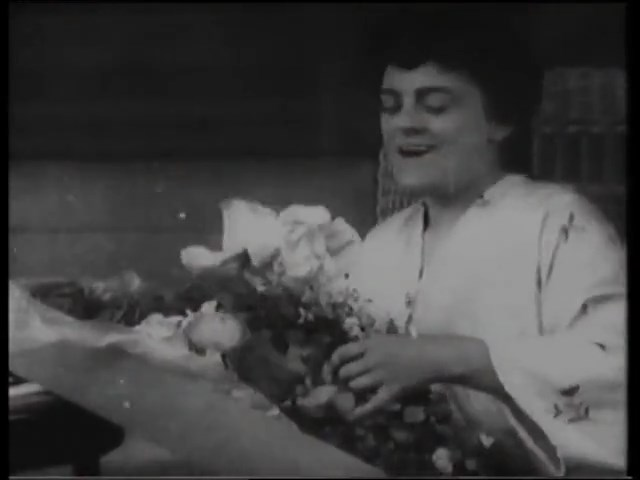
Medium close-up

8. Medium close-up of the lady. She kisses the flowers.

9. Same shot as Episode 7. The maid introduces the man. He sits next to the woman. They flirt.

Back to the Ribbon Counter

1. A shop. Two women come in, examine various goods, leave. The widow comes in and faints when she discovers that the ribbon clerck is her gallant summer beau.

The film has been mentioned as an example of the regular "feature productions" produced by Biograph from the summer of 1904, which allowed this company to overtake the Edison Company as "America's foremost motion picture producer". It has also been stressed that his is one of the first examples where a scene filmed as a wide shot is interrupted by a close-up of the protagonist.
