= A Railway Tragedy =

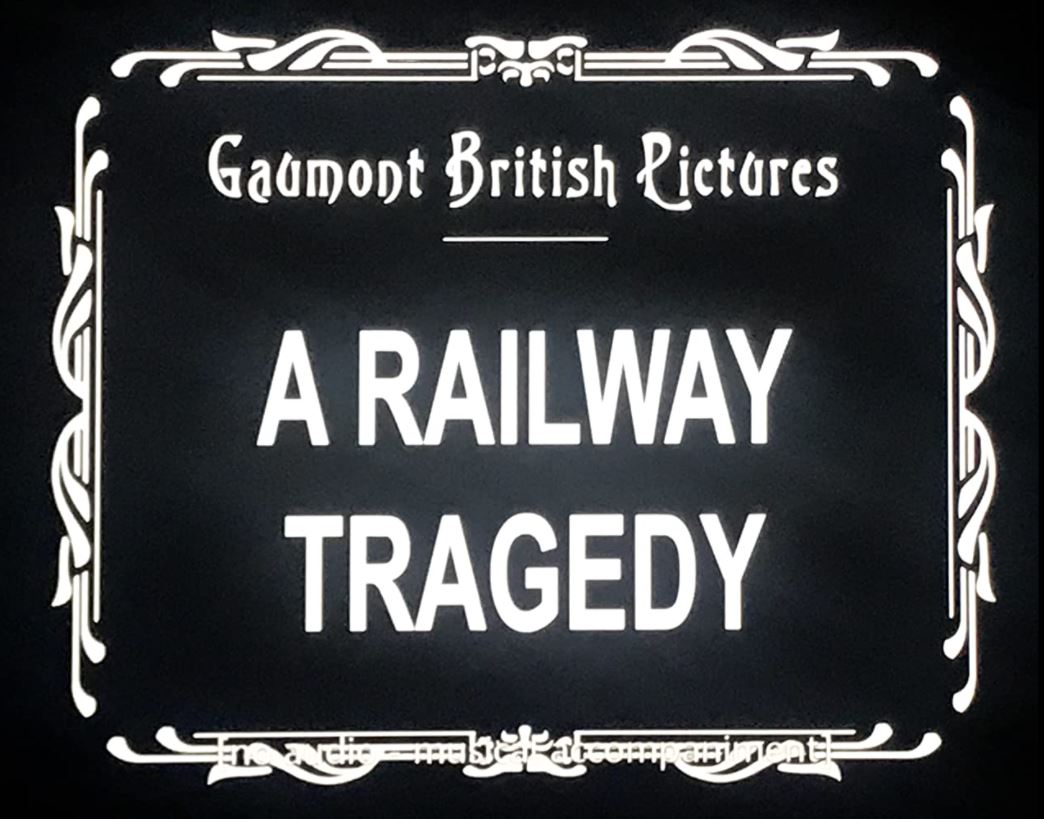
- Title screen for A Railway Tragedy (1904)
- Production company: Gaumont-British
- Release date: 1904
- Running time: 5 min.
- Country: United Kingdom

A Railway Tragedy is a 1904 British silent crime film, produced by the Gaumont-British Picture Corporation.

== Plot ==
At the time of release, the film was described as follows: "A Railway Tragedy is about a robbery and assault on an attractive young woman in a train compartment. During the attack, the young woman is thrown from the train. The film ends with the capture of the villain on a station platform as he attempts to make his getaway."

== Production and distribution ==
Very little information has been preserved about this film. The name of the director and actors is no longer known. We only know that the film has been produced in 1904 in the United Kingdom by the Gaumont British Picture Corporation and that it has been distributed in the United States by the American Mutoscope and Biograph Company who has registered it for copyright on 10 October 1904.

== Analysis ==
screenshot

The film is one of the earliest British crime films. It is composed of five wide shots filmed on location and one medium shot of a constructed set:

1. A street in front of a station. A woman gets out of a Hansom cab and pays the cabbie while being observed by a mustachioed man. The camera pans to follow the woman as she enters the station.

2. A platform inside the station. The woman walks towards the camera, followed by the man as a train enters the station. She enters one of the compartments and closes the door. Just before the start of the train, the man enters the same compartment.

3. Constructed set: the inside of a train compartment. The woman is alone with the man, reading a book. The book falls on the ground as she falls asleep. The man checks that she is really asleep and takes her purse of which he extracts a large number of banknotes before putting the purse back on her knees. She wakes up and finds out that her money has disappeared. She asks for an explanation, first politely, but she then tries to search him. He grasps her, open the door and throws her out of the train.

screenshot

4. A train track with the body of the woman across the rails. Two men run down a grassy slope and the camera pans to follow them as they carry her away just before the arrival of a train (after a jump cut).

5. The platform of a small train station with several people, including the woman, waiting. A train enters the station and several people, including the man, alight. He runs towards the camera and when the woman tries to stop him, he throws her on the ground. Several men run to stop him and he offers them money to let him escape but to no avail. After the station master has signaled the train that it could leave, he comes and help the men.

6. Same as 5 with a slightly different angle. Several men and train officials carry the man away and the camera pans to follow them.

The film combines footage from a train ride with dramatic scenes. It opens on the streets, at the arrival and departure of the train at the station, and it ends with the train's arrival at another station. When the train door opens during the attack scene, it is obvious that the railway compartment was a constructed set as the landscape remains stationary.

This film has been mentioned as one of the early films focusing on "the changing behavioral norms and social conventions precipitated by mass transportation technologies, as well as the opportunities for crime they presented." It was observed that it "dramatizes the dangers of the seclusion provided by European railway cars" with their compartment coaches. The film has also been cited as an example of the fact that British filmmakers seem to have "used the documentary/drama form to point out existing social evils rather than to make films with the light-touch approach of the French or the Americans".
