= 1905 in film =

The year 1905 in film involved some significant events.

== Events ==
- The Manaki brothers make the first motion picture in the Balkans, The Weavers.
- Pathé Frères colors black-and-white films by machine.
- Filmmaking takes an unexpected historical role by recording activities along Market Street, in the year preceding the destruction from the San Francisco earthquake of 1906 (footage in the modern film Trip Down Market Street 1905/2005).
- Aleksandr Khanzhonkov begins filming his first documentaries.
- The Misadventure of a French Gentleman Without Pants at the Zandvoort Beach, the oldest surviving Dutch fictional film is released by Alberts Frères. Later to be included in the canon of Dutch cinema as released by the Netherlands Film Festival.
- June 19 – John P. Harris and his brother Harry in Pittsburgh open the first theater in the U.S. devoted exclusively to the exhibition of motion pictures.
- December 16 – Variety, an entertainment trade newspaper that would later cover the film industry, is published for the first time in New York City.

== Notable films ==
=== # ===
- 2 A.M. in the Subway, directed by Billy Bitzer – (US)

=== A ===
- Adventures of Sherlock Holmes; or, Held for Ransom (lost), directed by J. Stuart Blackton, based on the 1890 novel The Sign of the Four by Arthur Conan Doyle – (US)
- An Adventurous Automobile Trip (Le Raid Paris–Monte Carlo en deux heures), directed by Georges Méliès – (France)
- Airy Fairy Lillian Tries on Her New Corsets, directed by Frank Marion and Wallace McCutcheon Sr. – (US)
- Automobile Races at Ormond, Fla., produced by the American Mutoscope and Biograph Company – (US)

=== B ===
- Baby's Toilet, directed by Cecil Hepworth – (UK)
- The Black Imp (Le Diable noir), directed by Georges Méliès – (France)
- Boarding School Girls, directed by Edwin S. Porter – (US)

=== C ===
- Le Cake-walk du Nouveau Cirque (Cake Walk, Performed by Nouveau Cirque), directed by Alice Guy – (France)
- La charité du prestidigitateur (The Magician's Alms), directed by Alice Guy – (France)
- Chien jouant à la balle (Clown, Dog and Balloon), directed by Alice Guy – (France)
- Le coq dressé de Cook et Rilly (Cook & Rilly's Trained Rooster), directed by Alice Guy – (France)

=== D ===
- Dingjun Mountain (lost), directed by Ren Qingtai – (China)

=== E ===
- The Enchanted Sedan Chair (La Chaise à porteurs enchantée), directed by Georges Méliès – (France)
- Esmeralda, directed by Alice Guy and Victorin-Hippolyte Jasset, based upon the 1831 novel The Hunchback of Notre-Dame by Victor Hugo – (France)
- Espagne, directed by Alice Guy – (France)

=== F ===
- Five O'Clock Tea, directed by Alice Guy, starring Dranem – (France)

=== H ===
- Halifax Catholic Procession, produced by Mitchell and Kenyon – (UK)
- Los héroes del sitio de Zaragoza (The Heroes of the Siege of Saragossa), directed by Segundo de Chomón – (Spain)

=== I ===
- In the Swimming Pool, Palm Beach, Florida, directed by G. W. Bitzer – (US)
- The Infernal Cave (L'antre infernale), directed by Gaston Velle – (France)
- The Inventor Crazybrains and His Wonderful Airship (Le Dirigeable fantastique ou le Cauchemar d'un inventeur), directed by Georges Méliès – (France)

=== K ===
- The Kleptomaniac, directed by Edwin S. Porter – (US)

=== L ===
- Lilas blanc (White Lilacs), directed by Alice Guy, starring Félix Mayol – (France)
- The Little Train Robbery, directed by Edwin S. Porter – (US)
- The Living Playing Cards (Les Cartes vivantes), directed by Georges Méliès – (France)

=== M ===
- Les maçons (The Bricklayers), directed by Alice Guy – (France)
- La malagueña et le torero (The Malagueña and the Bullfighter), directed by Alice Guy – (France)
- The Miller's Daughter, directed by Wallace McCutcheon Sr. and Edwin S. Porter, based on the 1880 stage play Hazel Kirke by Steele MacKaye – (US)
- The Misadventure of a French Gentleman Without Pants at the Zandvoort Beach (De mésaventure van een Fransch heertje zonder pantalon aan het strand te Zandvoort), directed by Willy Mullens – (Netherlands)
- The Mysterious Island (L'Île de Calypso), directed by Georges Méliès, based upon the ancient Greek epic poem the Odyssey by Homer – (France)

=== N ===
- The Night Before Christmas, directed by Edwin S. Porter, starring Harry Eytinge, based upon the 1823 poem by Clement Clarke Moore – (US)
- The Nihilist, directed by Wallace McCutcheon Sr. – (US)

=== O ===
- The Other Side of the Hedge, directed by Lewin Fitzhamon – (UK)
- Our New Errand Boy, directed by James Williamson – (UK)

=== P ===
- The Palace of the Arabian Nights (Le Palais des mille et une nuits), directed by Georges Méliès – (France)
- Polin, l'anatomie du conscrit (Polin, the Anatomy of a Conscript), directed by Alice Guy – (France)
- La polka des trottins (The Trottins' Polka), directed by Alice Guy, starring Félix Mayol – (France)
- La Presa di Roma (The Capture of Rome), directed by Filoteo Alberini – (Italy)

=== R ===
- Rescued by Rover, directed by Lewin Fitzhamon and Cecil Hepworth – (UK)
- Revolution in Russia (La révolution en Russie), directed by Lucien Nonguet – (France)
- Rip's Dream (La Légende de Rip Van Vinckle), directed by Georges Méliès, based upon the 1819 short story Rip Van Winkle by Washington Irving – (France)

=== S ===
- The Seven Ages, directed by Edwin S. Porter – (US)
- Special March Past of St. Joseph's Scholars and Special Parade of St. Matthew's Pupils, Blackburn, produced by Mitchell and Kenyon – (UK)
- La statue (The Statue), directed by Alice Guy – (France)

=== T ===
- Le tango (The Tango), directed by Alice Guy – (France)
- A Trip to Salt Lake City, directed by G. W. Bitzer – (US)

=== U ===
- The Unfortunate Policeman, produced by Robert W. Paul – (UK)

=== V ===
- Le vrai jiu-jitsu (The True Jiu-jitsu), directed by Alice Guy – (France)

=== W ===
- The Weavers, directed by the Manaki Brothers – (Balkans)
- The Whole Dam Family and the Dam Dog, directed by Edwin S. Porter – (US)

== Births ==
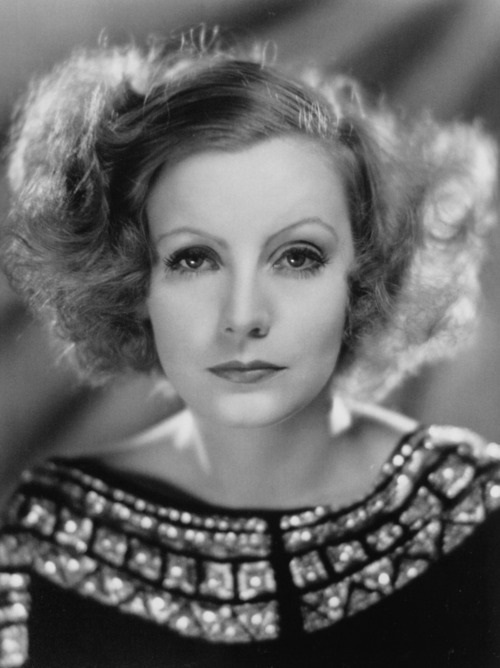
Greta Garbo.

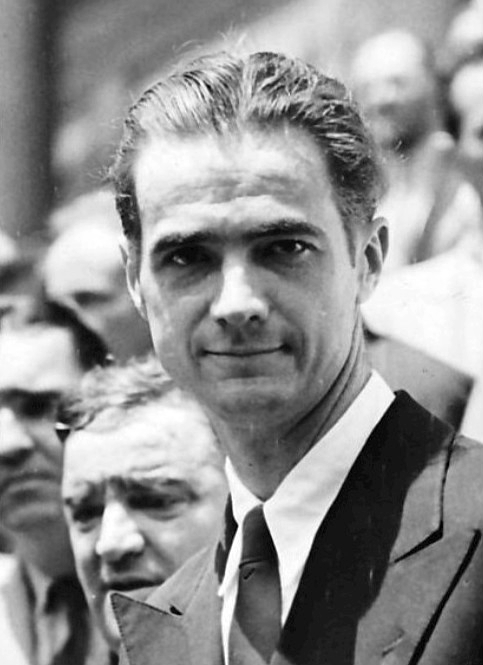
Howard Hughes.

Month	Date	Name	Country	Profession	Died
January	3	Anna May Wong	US	Actress	1961
January	12	Tex Ritter	US	Actor, singer	1974
January	13	Kay Francis	US	Actress	1968
January	15	Sterling Holloway	US	Actor	1992
January	17	Grant Withers	US	Actor	1959
January	18	Chick Chandler	US	Actor	1988
January	26	Charles Lane	US	Actor	2007
February	21	Henry Mollison	UK	Actor	1985
February	27	Franchot Tone	US	Actor, producer, director	1968
March	10	Richard Haydn	UK	Actor	1985
March	17	Lillian Yarbo	US	Actress	1996
March	18	Robert Donat	UK	Actor	1958
March	23	Joan Crawford	US	Actress	1977
April	8	Ilka Chase	US	Actress	1978
April	17	Arthur Lake	US	Actor	1987
May	1	Leila Hyams	US	Actress, model	1977
May	15	Joseph Cotten	US	Actor	1994
May	16	Henry Fonda	US	Actor	1982
June	19	Mildred Natwick	US	Actress	1994
June	25	Arthur Maria Rabenalt	Austria	Director	1993
July	13	Edvin Laine	Finland	Director, actor	1989
July	17	William Gargan	US	Actor	1979
July	29	Clara Bow	US	Actress	1965
August	2	Myrna Loy	US	Actress	1993
August	2	Ruth Nelson	US	Actress	1992
September	5	Meta Luts	Estonia	Actress	1958
September	18	Greta Garbo	Sweden	Actress	1990
September	21	Marguerite Roberts	US	Screenwriter	1989
September	22	Muriel Box	UK	Director, screenwriter	1991
September	30	Michael Powell	UK	Filmmaker	1990
October	7	Andy Devine	US	Actor	1977
October	10	Aksella Luts	Estonia	Actress, screenwriter, dancer, choreographer, editor	2005
November	5	Joel McCrea	US	Actor	1990
November	7	William Alwyn	UK	Composer	1985
November	17	Mischa Auer	Russia	Actor	1967
November	27	Astrid Allwyn	US	Actress	1978
December	5	Otto Preminger	Austria-Hungary	Director, producer, actor	1986
December	11	Gilbert Roland	Mexico	Actor	1994
December	24	Howard Hughes	US	Director, producer, editor	1976

== Deaths ==
- March 24 – Jules Verne, novelist of fantasy stories and science fiction (born 1828)
- March 25 – Maurice Barrymore, Barrymore family patriarch (born 1849)
- April 23 – Joseph Jefferson, Rip Van Winkle (1896 film) (born 1829)
- October 13 – Henry Irving, English Shakespearean actor and stage manager, who at one time was Bram Stoker's employer (born 1838)

== Debuts ==
- Arthur Johnson – The White Caps (short)
- Max Linder – First Night Out (short)
- Paul Panzer – Stolen by Gypsies (short)
