= List of American films of 1905 =

A list of American films released in 1905.

Title	Director	Cast	Genre	Notes
2 A. M. in the Subway	Billy Bitzer			
Adventures of Sherlock Holmes; or, Held for Ransom	J. Stuart Blackton			
Airy Fairy Lillian Tries on Her New Corsets				
A Ballroom Tragedy				
Burglar Bill				
Coney Island at Night				
A Dog Lost, Strayed or Stolen				
Escape from Sing Sing				
The Green Goods Man; or, Josiah and Samanthy's Experience with the Original 'American Confidence Game'				
The Great Jewel Mystery				
Hippodrome Races, Dreamland, Coney Island				
How Jones Lost His Roll	Edwin Stanton Porter			
I. B. Dam and the Whole Dam Family				
Impersonation of Britt-Nelson Fight				
In the Swimming Pool, Palm Beach, Florida	Billy Bitzer			
A Kentucky Feud				
The Kleptomaniac				
License No. 13; or, The Hoodoo Automobile				
Life of an American Policeman				
The Little Train Robbery	Edwin Stanton Porter			
The Miller's Daughter	Wallace McCutcheon Sr., Edwin Stanton Porter			
Moving Day; or, No Children Allowed				
The Newsboy				
The Night Before Christmas	Edwin Stanton Porter			
The Nihilist				
Peeping Tom in the Dressing Room				
A Policeman's Love Affair				
Raffles the Amateur Cracksman	Broncho Billy Anderson		Adventure/Romance	
Raffles the Dog				
The Rat Trap Pickpocket Detector			Comedy	
Reuben in the Opium Joint				
The Servant Girl Problem				
The Seven Ages				
Tom, Tom, the Piper's Son				
The Train Wreckers				
The Vanderbilt Auto Race				
Watermelon Patch				
The White Caps	Wallace McCutcheon Sr., Edwin Stanton Porter			
The Whole Dam Family and the Dam Dog				

== See also ==
- 1905 in the United States
