= The Miller's Daughter =

The Miller's Daughter may refer to:

- The Miller's Daughter (poem), by Alfred, Lord Tennyson
- The Miller's Daughter (1905 film), based on the play Hazel Kirke
- The Miller's Daughter (1934 film), directed by Isadore Freleng
- The Miller's Daughter (album), 2005 album by The Drones
- "The Miller's Daughter" (Once Upon a Time), an episode of the television series Once Upon a Time
- The Miller's Daughter (2024 opera), by Victoria Erickson and Jodi Goble

== See also ==
- Fair Em or Fair Em, the Miller's Daughter of Manchester, Elizabethan era stage play
