= Close-up =

Photography and film term referring to framing a shot

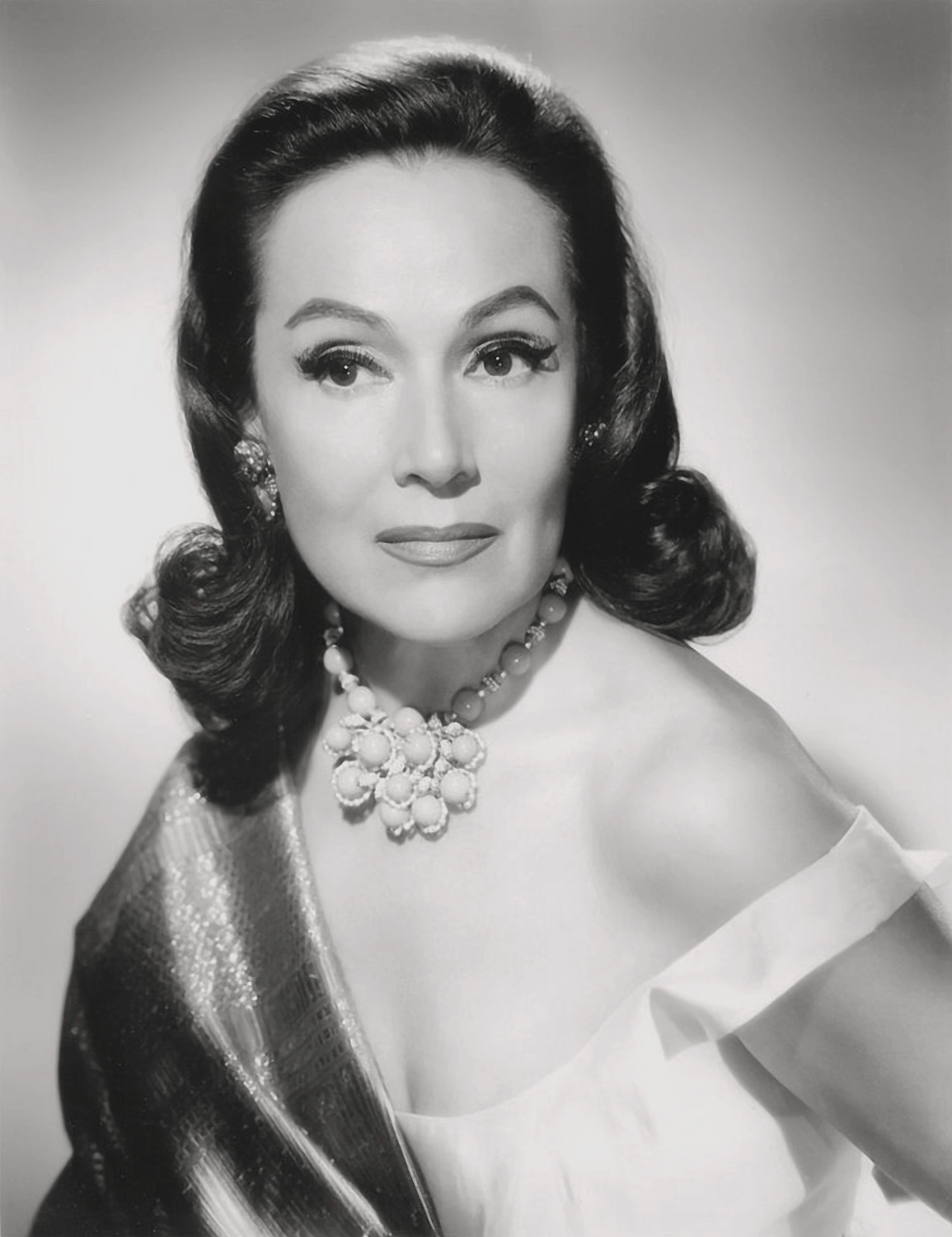
Mexican actress Dolores del Río in a closeup publicity photograph of 1961

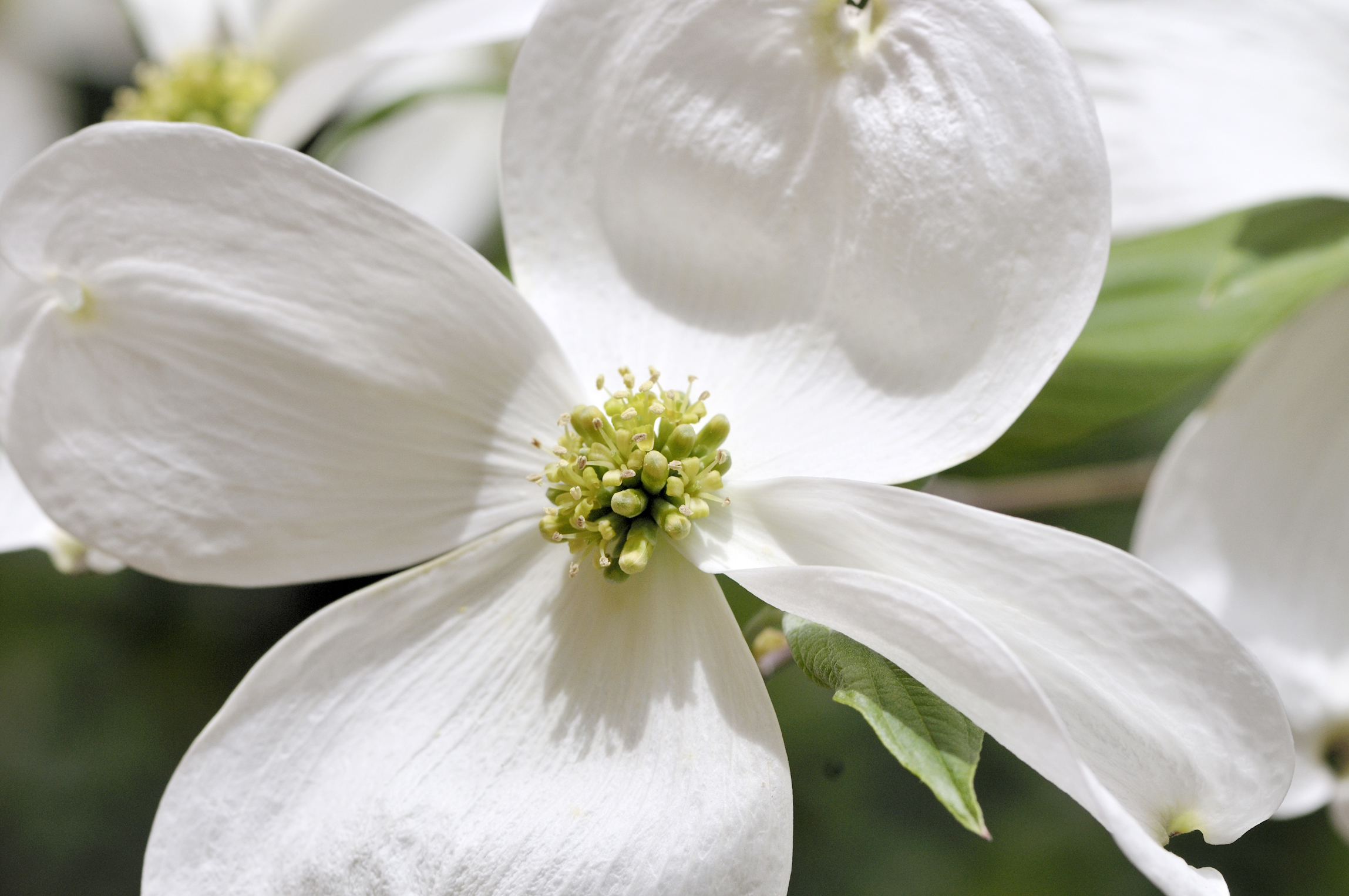
A close-up of Cornus florida

A close-up or closeup in filmmaking, television production and still photography medium is a type of shot that tightly frames a person or object. Close-ups are one of the standard shots used regularly with medium and long shots (cinematic techniques). Close-ups display the most detail, but they do not include the broader scene. Moving toward or away from a close-up is a common type of zooming. A close up is taken from head to neck, giving the viewer a detailed view of the subject's face.

== History ==
Most early filmmakers, such as Thomas Edison, Auguste and Louis Lumière and Georges Méliès, tended not to use close-ups and preferred to frame their subjects in long shots, similar to the stage. Film historians disagree as to the filmmaker who first used a close-up. One of the best claims is for George Albert Smith in Hove, who used medium close-ups in films as early as 1898 and by 1900 was incorporating extreme close-ups in films such as As Seen Through a Telescope and Grandma's Reading Glass. In 1901, James Williamson, also working in Hove, made perhaps the most extreme close-up of all in The Big Swallow in which his character approaches the camera and appears to swallow it. The film Hamlet (1913) also makes use of early close ups. One of D. W. Griffith's short films, The Lonedale Operator (1911), makes significant use of a close-up of a wrench that a character pretends is a gun. Lillian Gish remarked on Griffith's use of the close-up:

The people in the front office got very upset. They came down and said: "The public doesn't pay for the head or the arms or the shoulders of the actor. They want the whole body. Let's give them their money's worth." Griffith stood very close to them and said: "Can you see my feet?" When they said no, he replied: "That's what I'm doing. I am using what the eyes can see."

== Practical application ==
Close-ups are used in many ways and for many reasons. They are often employed as cutaways from a more distant shot to show detail, such as characters' emotions or some intricate activity with their hands. Close cuts to characters' faces are used far more often in television than in movies and are especially common in soap operas. For a director, deliberately avoiding close-ups may create in the audience an emotional distance from the subject matter.

Close-ups are used for distinguishing main characters. Major characters are often given a close-up when they are introduced as a way of indicating their importance. Leading characters will have multiple close-ups. At the close of Sunset Boulevard (1950), the main character, a faded star under the delusion that she is making a triumphant return to acting, declaims melodramatically, "All right, Mr. DeMille, I'm ready for my close-up."

Close-up shots do not show the subject in the broad context of its surroundings. Low-budget films may use close-ups to avoid the expense of set construction. If overused, close-ups may leave viewers uncertain as to what they are seeing. Close-ups are rarely done with wide-angle lenses because perspective causes objects closer to the lens to be unnaturally enlarged. That may convey a sense of confusion, intoxication, or another unusual mental state.

== Close-up types ==
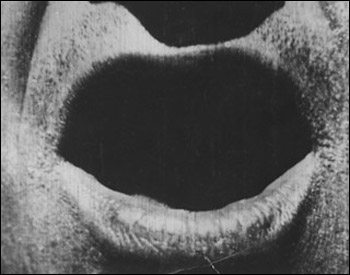
An extreme close-up from the 1901 short film The Big Swallow

There are various degrees of close-up depending on how tight (zoomed in) the shot is. The terminology varies between countries and even different companies, but in general, these are:

- Medium Close Up ("MCU" on camera scripts): Halfway between a mid shot and a close-up. Usually covers the subject's head and shoulders.
- Close Up ("CU"): A certain feature, such as someone's head, takes up the whole frame.
- Extreme Close Up ("ECU" or "XCU"): The shot is so tight that only a detail of the subject, such as someone's eyes, can be seen.
- Lean-In: when the juxtaposition of shots in a sequence, usually in a scene of dialogue, starts with medium or long shots, for example, and ends with close-ups.
- Lean-Out: the opposite of a lean-in, moving from close-ups out to longer shots.
- Lean: when a lean-in is followed by a lean-out.

When the close-up is used in the shooting, the subject is typically not put in exactly the middle of the frame, but instead slightly offset according to the law of the golden section.

== See also ==
- Macro photography
- Micrograph
- Shot (filmmaking)

== Sources ==
- Bordwell, David; Thompson, Kristin (2006). Film Art: An Introduction. New York: McGraw-Hill. ISBN 0-07-331027-1.
