= Up-to-Date Surgery =

- Directed by: Georges Méliès
- Starring: Georges Méliès
- Production company: Star Film Company
- Release dates: 1902 (France); February 1903 (USA)
- Country: France
- Language: Silent

Une indigestion, sold in the United States as Up-to-Date Surgery and in Britain as Sure Cure for Indigestion, and also known as Chirurgie fin de siècle, is a 1902 French short silent film by Georges Méliès.

== Production ==
Up-to-Date Surgery is strongly reminiscent of, and was probably inspired by, "Le Charlatan Fin de Siècle" ("The Turn-of-the-Century Charlatan"), an 1892 stage illusion at Méliès's Paris venue, the Théâtre Robert-Houdin. The stage illusion was a comic sketch in which an English patient, John Patt de Cok, visits the celebrated quack doctor Giuseppe Barbenmacaroni. Grotesque misadventures ensue, culminating in the patient exploding into pieces (though his head stays alive and well). The stage illusion also recalls at least two other Méliès films, Twentieth Century Surgery (1900) and The Doctor's Secret (1909).

Méliès appears in the film as the doctor with the saw. From this film onward, Méliès shot two separate original camera negatives for each of his films: one for the domestic market, and one for foreign export.

== Themes ==
The film combines two recurring themes in Méliès's work: parodies of medical science, and body parts separated from their bodies. The latter was a common theme for trick films in the first years of cinema, such as Cecil Hepworth's Explosion of a Motor Car (1900) and Alice Guy's Chirurgie fin de siècle (1901).

Film scholar Tom Gunning, who posits that the theme of separated body parts is "derived ultimately from shamanism", comments that Up-to-Date Surgery could be seen as a sequel to the landmark James Williamson film The Big Swallow (1901); both are concerned with the body's "mysterious inner space".

== Release ==
The film was sold by Méliès's Star Film Company and is numbered 422–425 in its catalogues. The earliest known English-language titles are Up-to-Date Surgery (in the US market) and Sure Cure for Indigestion (in the UK); the title Chirurgie fin de siècle has also been used by writers discussing the film. The Lubin Manufacturing Company re-released the film in the United States under the title Dr. Lorenz Outdone (Adolf Lorenz was a famous surgeon of the time), describing the doctor character as "Dr. Lorenz No. 2".

A print of the film survives at the George Eastman Museum.
