= Early Fashions on Brighton Pier =

1898 British film by James Williamson

Early Fashions on Brighton Pier is an 1898 British silent actuality film, generally considered to be shot by Scottish film pioneer James Williamson. Previously, the film had been credited to George Albert Smith. The more recent attribution to Williamson is based mainly on the identification of two of Williamson's sons in the pier crowd. It is categorised in the Screen Archive South East as On the West Pier.
