= The Clown Barber =

1898 British short film by James Williamson

- Directed by: James Williamson
- Produced by: James Williamson
- Cinematography: James Williamson
- Distributed by: Williamson Kinematograph Company
- Release date: 1898
- Country: United Kingdom
- Language: Silent

The Clown Barber is an 1898 British short black-and-white silent film directed and produced by the Scottish film pioneer James Williamson.

The film was produced in Brighton and Hove. The actual film is 21.34 m long.
