= Baby's Toilet =

1905 British film by Cecil Hepworth

- Directed by: Cecil Hepworth
- Starring: Elizabeth Hepworth
- Distributed by: Hepworth Manufacturing Company
- Release date: 1905
- Running time: 3 minutes
- Country: UK

Baby's Toilet is a 1905 British short film directed by Cecil Hepworth. The film features Hepworth's baby daughter Elizabeth being bathed and dressed by her nurse, and was categorised by Hepworth as a "Domestic Scene". In the film Hepworth combines a series of shots to produce a narrative depicting the bathing process from beginning to end. He would later acknowledge the influence of the pioneering work of the Lumière brothers on this and other similar films he produced in the 1900s. The print of Baby's Toilet survives, and Patrick Russell of the British Film Institute observes: "Long after Elizabeth Hepworth's own death, the affecting innocence of infancy remains a basic human theme. Baby's Toilet has lost none of its charm."

== Synopsis ==
The nurse bounces baby Elizabeth on her knee before placing her into her bath. The nurse sponges Elizabeth and drizzles water over her head and body, which Elizabeth evidently finds agreeable. She is then taken out of the bath, towel dried and powdered, again appearing to enjoy the procedure and peering inquisitively into the camera. Elizabeth is less impressed to be unceremoniously placed into an uncomfortable weighing scale, showing her displeasure by wriggling and grizzling. Finally Elizabeth is dressed and bounced again by the nurse. She begins to cry, but is pacified when the nurse produces her breast and the child is able to feed from the nurse who has a 2 month old baby at home whom she breast feeds. This is the way that the nurse became attached to the baby Elizabeth. The nurse came back later to keep feeding Elizabeth.
