= Our New Errand Boy =

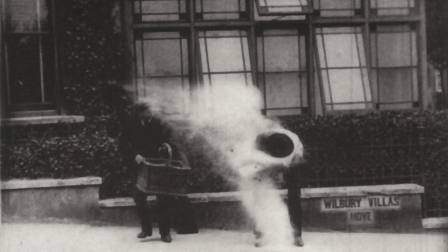
- Screenshot from the film
- Directed by: James Williamson
- Starring: Tom Williamson; James Williamson
- Cinematography: James Williamson
- Production company: Williamson Kinematograph Company
- Release date: 1905
- Running time: 5 mins 46 secs
- Country: United Kingdom
- Language: Silent

Our New Errand Boy is a 1905 British short silent comedy film, directed by James Williamson, about a new errand boy, engaged by a grocer who soon regrets the appointment. This "relatively unambitious" chase comedy, according to Michael Brooke of BFI Screenonline, "is one of a number of Williamson films featuring a mischievous child, played by the director's son Tom". "Although essentially a series of sketches", this film, according to David Fisher, "demonstrates the extent to which Williamson had developed film technique For a start, the film has a title frame, which includes the logo of the Williamson Cinematograph Company", and, "the chase section anticipates the American comedies of the next decade".

The film stars the director's son, Tom Williamson, one of the first professional child actors, featured in several films, generally directed by his father (who is also an interpreter of the film here).

== Plot ==
A mischievous boy (Tom Williamson), sent by the grocer (James Williamson) to deliver the goods home, causes havoc in the streets of Hove. When he returns to the shop, he finds all his victims waiting for him. It follows an adventurous escape, in which the unrepentant boy soon gets the better of his pursuers and laughs at them.

== Cast ==
- Tom Williamson as the Errand Boy
- James Williamson as the Grocer
