= An Interesting Story =

1904 film

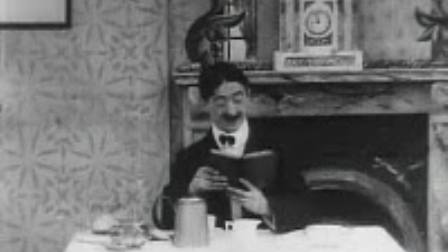
- Screenshot from the film
- Directed by: James Williamson
- Produced by: James Williamson
- Cinematography: James Williamson
- Production company: Williamson Kinematograph Company
- Release date: 1904
- Running time: 5 mins
- Country: United Kingdom
- Language: Silent

An Interesting Story is a 1904 British short silent comedy film, directed by James Williamson, showing a man so engrossed in his book he is dangerously oblivious to what happens around him.
