= The Little Match Seller =

- Screenshot from the film
- Directed by: James Williamson
- Written by: Hans Christian Andersen
- Cinematography: James Williamson
- Production company: Williamson Kinematograph Company
- Release date: 1902
- Running time: 3 mins 15 secs
- Country: United Kingdom
- Language: Silent

The Little Match Seller

The Little Match Seller is a 1902 British short silent drama film, directed by James Williamson, retelling the classic 1845 Hans Christian Andersen fable of the sad life and tragic death of a little match seller. This major fiction film of the period was, according to Michael Brooke of BFI Screenonline, "a serious attempt at depicting a person's inner emotional life on film through purely visual means (there is no onscreen text of any kind), using trick effects not to provoke laughter but for serious dramatic reasons."

== Plot ==
The film, which is just over 3 minutes long, depicts a young girl selling matchsticks on Christmas Eve. One passerby steals her shoes, and another passes without acknowledging her. As she freezes to death, she becomes increasingly desperate and begins to light her matches for warmth. In the flame of each match, she has visions of Christmas scenes including a tree decked in tinsel and a table full of food. Eventually, she succumbs to the elements and an angel comes to bring her soul to heaven. A policeman discovers her dead body.

== Review ==
BFI Screenonline reviewer Michael Brooke states that the film, "shows a similar interest in the plight of the downtrodden," but is, in most other respects, "a very different type of film" than the director's A Reservist, Before the War and After the War and The Soldier's Return (both 1902), which "were inspired by the experience of soldiers returning from the only recently concluded Boer War." This film "is a very faithful adaptation of Hans Christian Andersen's 1846 fable (which is brief enough to suggest that the original could have been read aloud during screenings) and, instead of the other films' scrupulously realistic presentation, Williamson here resorts to numerous special effects, mostly in the form of superimpositions." "However, these are entirely true to the spirit of the original story, whose dramatic and emotional centerpiece is the series of visions seen by the little match seller when striking matches to keep warm," and the film, "is as ambitious and innovative as A Reservist." The director, he concludes, "would continue to explore this new ground in later films such as The Old Chorister (1904)."
