= £100 Reward =

1908 British short silent film by James Williamson

- Directed by: James Williamson
- Production company: Williamson Kinematograph Company
- Release date: April 1908
- Running time: 6 minutes 34 seconds
- Country: United Kingdom
- Language: Silent film

£100 Reward is a 1908 British short silent film directed by James Williamson.

== Plot ==
A poor family, suffering from a lack of food, plan to sell their dog to gain some extra income. Before they act on their plan, the dog discovers some buried jewels. These turn out to be stolen, and the family are given a £100 reward.
