= The Miller's Daughter (poem) =

Narrative poem by Tennyson

- by Alfred Tennyson
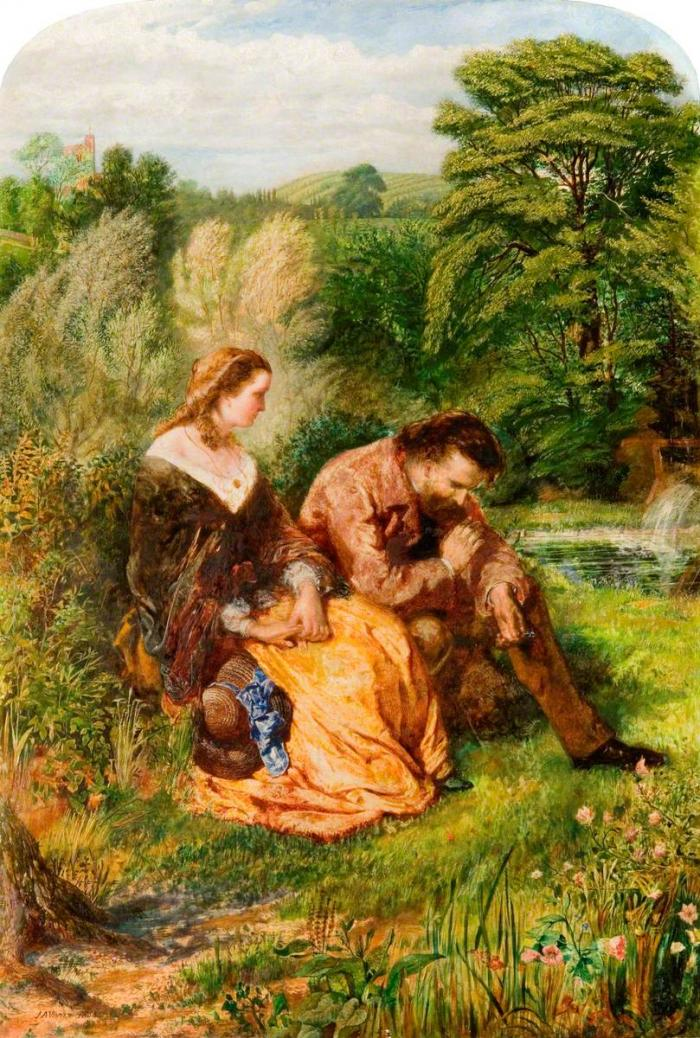
- The Miller's Daughter by John Alfred Vinter (1859)
- Genre(s): Romanticism
- Meter: Iambic tetrameter Iambic trimeter
- Publication date: 1833; 1842
- Lines: 246

The Miller's Daughter is a narrative poem by Alfred Tennyson, first printed in 1833 and significantly revised in 1842.

== Textual history ==
The poem was first published in 1833. It was greatly altered when republished in 1842, and in some respects, so Edward Fitzgerald thought, not for the better. No alterations of much importance were made in it after 1842. The characters as well as the scenery were, it seems, purely imaginary. Tennyson said that if he thought of any mill it was that of Trumpington, near Cambridge, which bears a general resemblance to the picture here given.

In the first edition the poem opened with the following stanza, which the Quarterly ridiculed:

I met in all the close green ways,
While walking with my line and rod,
The wealthy miller's mealy face,
Like the moon in an ivy-tod.
He looked so jolly and so good—
While fishing in the milldam-water,
I laughed to see him as he stood,
And dreamt not of the miller's daughter.

== Legacy ==
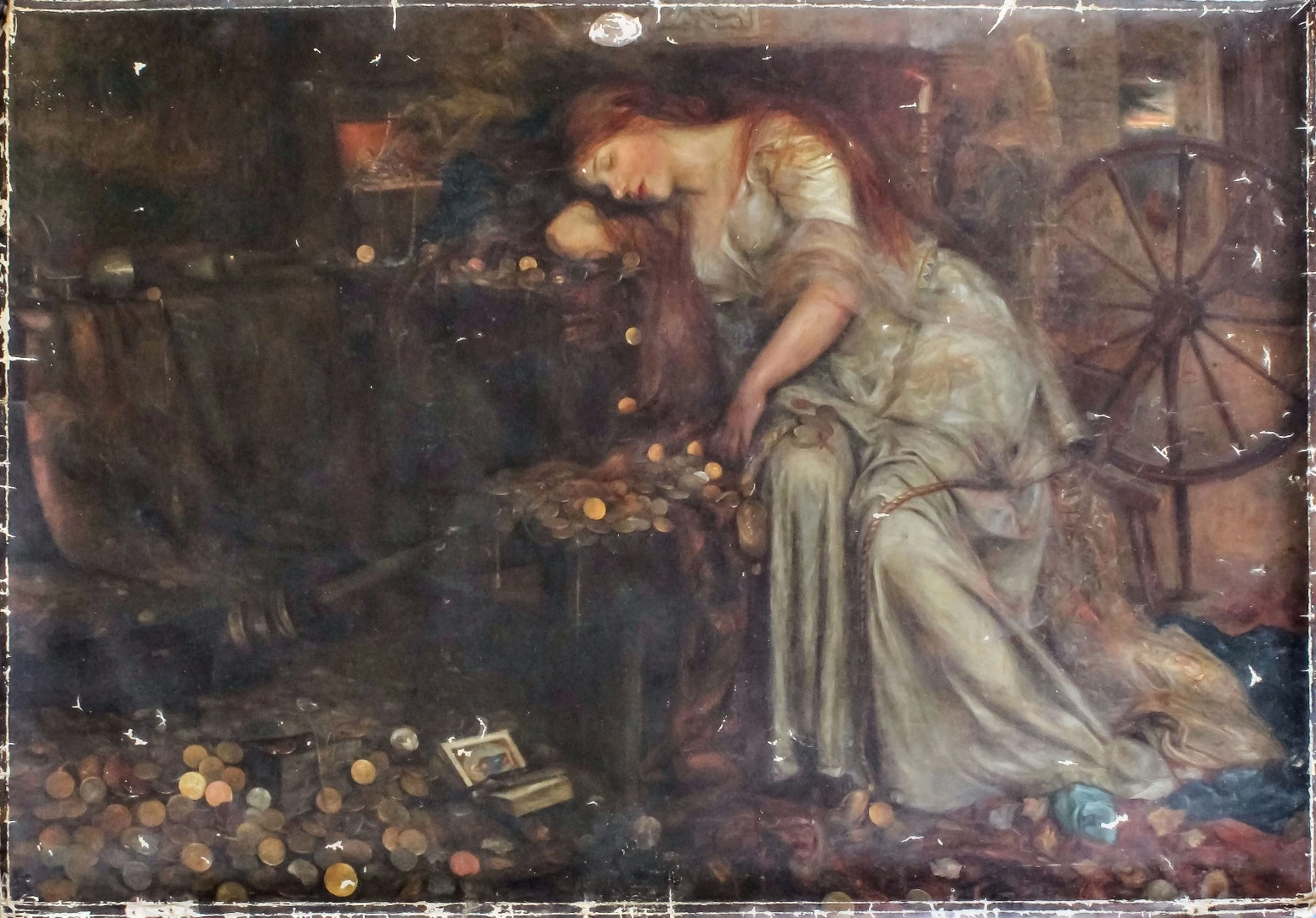
The Sleeping Miller's Daughter, painted in the style of Waterhouse (undated)

The narrative contains the following love lyric, which Arthur Quiller-Couch included separately under the same title in the first (1900) and second (1939) editions of The Oxford Book of English Verse:

It is the miller's daughter,
And she is grown so dear, so dear,
That I would be the jewel
That trembles at (Note: 1872. In.) her ear:
For hid in ringlets day and night,
I'd touch her neck so warm and white.

And I would be the girdle
About her dainty, dainty waist,
And her heart would beat against me,
In sorrow and in rest:
And I should know if it beat right,
I'd clasp it round so close and tight. (Note: 1833. I wish I were the girdle Buckled about her dainty waist, That her heart might beat against me, In sorrow and in rest. I should know well if it beat right, I'd clasp it round so close and tight.)

And I would be the necklace,
And all day long to fall and rise (Note: 1833. I wish I were her necklace, So might I ever fall and rise.)
Upon her balmy bosom,
With her laughter or her sighs,
And I would lie so light, so light, (Note: 1833. So warm and light.)
I scarce should be (Note: 1833. I would not be.) unclasp'd at night.

== Translation ==
An Arabic version of the extracted lyric above, translated by Safa Khulusi and entitled ابنة الطحان, was published in the Al-Risala Magazine, Issue 475, on 10 August 1942.

== Bibliography ==
- Collins, John Churton, ed. (1900). The Early Poems of Alfred, Lord Tennyson. London: Methuen & Co. pp. 58–68.
- Tennyson, Hallam (1897). Alfred Lord Tennyson: A Memoir by his Son. Vol. 1. London: Macmillan and Co., Limited. pp. 117–118.
