= Life of an American Fireman =

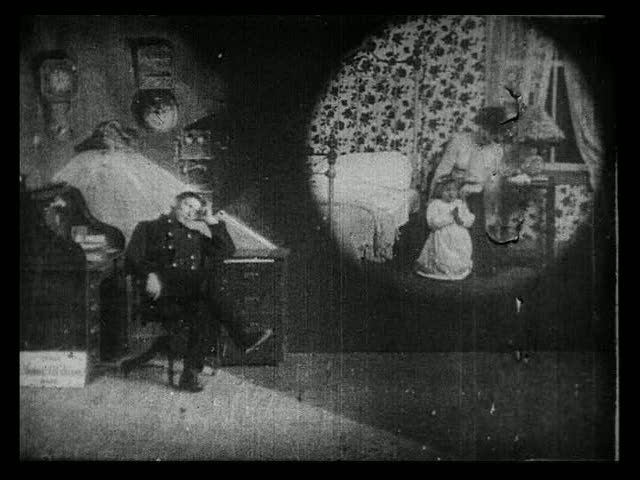
- Opening scene from the film.
- Directed by: Edwin S. Porter
- Starring: Arthur White; Vivian Vaughan
- Distributed by: Edison Manufacturing Company
- Release date: January 1903
- Country: United States
- Language: Silent film

Life of an American Fireman is a short, silent film Edwin S. Porter made for the Edison Manufacturing Company. It was shot late in 1902 and distributed early in 1903. One of the earliest American narrative films, it depicts the rescue of a woman and child from a burning building. It bears notable similarities to the 1901 British short film Fire!, directed by James Williamson.

In 2016, the film was selected for preservation in the United States National Film Registry by the Library of Congress as being "culturally, historically, or aesthetically significant".

== Historical significance ==
Life of an American Fireman

Life of an American Fireman is notable for its synthesis of numerous innovations in film technique that had occurred in the late 19th and early 20th centuries. Specifically, Porter builds a continuous narrative over seven scenes, rendered in a total of nine shots:

1. The Fireman's Vision of an Imperilled [sic] Woman and Child.
2. A Close View of a New York Fire Alarm Box.
3. The Interior of the Sleeping Quarters in the Fire House.
4. Interior of the Engine House.
5. The Apparatus Leaving the Engine House.
6. Off to the Fire.
7. The Arrival at the Fire.

This particular construction of time and space was not invented by Porter, but he did maximize its use and further develop it in his more famous film of 1903, The Great Train Robbery.

Charles Musser, a film scholar, points out that this film represents the social role of firefighters was changing at the time.

== Differing versions ==
The film was long considered important for its unusual editing style, being considered the earliest example of cross-cutting, notably during the final scenes of the rescue of the woman and her child. On the basis of this, Porter was hailed as an innovative editor. However, subsequent research by the paper print project at the Library of Congress suggested that the cross-cut version was re-edited at some unspecified time after the film's 1903 release, and that in its original form it used few, if any, of the pioneering edits claimed. As originally released, the interior point of view of the burning house is shown first and completed. Then the exact same action repeating itself is shown again from the exterior. Charles Musser has chronicled the history of this controversy in Before the Nickelodeon and concluded that the paper-print version containing the repetitive action was the one released in 1903.

== Influence ==
Martin Scorsese has noted that Life of an American Fireman greatly influenced the visual style of his 1982 film The King of Comedy.

== See also ==
- Edwin S. Porter filmography
- Treasures from American Film Archives
