= Stop Thief! =

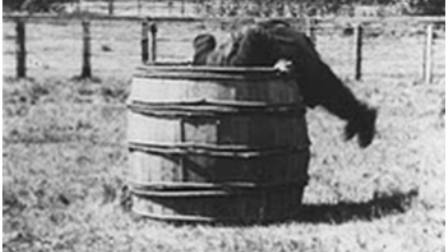
- Screenshot from the film
- Directed by: James Williamson
- Produced by: James Williamson
- Starring: Sam Dalton
- Cinematography: James Williamson
- Production company: Williamson Kinematograph Company
- Release date: October 1901
- Running time: 2 minutes 8 seconds
- Country: United Kingdom
- Language: Silent

Stop Thief! is a 1901 British short silent drama film, directed by James Williamson, showing a tramp getting his comeuppance after stealing some meat from a butcher and his dogs. "One of the first true 'chase' films made not just in Britain but anywhere else", according to Michael Brooke of BFI Screenonline. It was released along with Fire! (1901), "indicating the direction Williamson would take over the next few years, as he refined this new film grammar to tell stories of unprecedented narrative and emotional sophistication."

== Review ==
BFI Screenonline reviewer Michael Brooke points out that the film "features three sequential shots depicting continuous high-speed dramatic action and a fully worked-out narrative with a clear beginning (the tramp's theft of the joint of meat), middle (the chase through the village), end (his violent comeuppance after hiding in a large barrel), dramatic irony (the joint is reduced to a bare bone by the dogs who are ostensibly helping the butcher) and a witty punchline (the butcher uses the bone as a club with which to prolong the tramp's agonies)." "Another relative innovation is that despite this relative complexity (at least for the time), Stop Thief! is completely comprehensible without any intertitles or accompanying context-setting explanation, the film's title summing up both the situation and giving voice to the only words uttered on screen."
