= The Misadventure of a French Gentleman Without Pants at the Zandvoort Beach =

De mésaventure van een Fransch heertje zonder pantalon aan het strand te Zandvoort
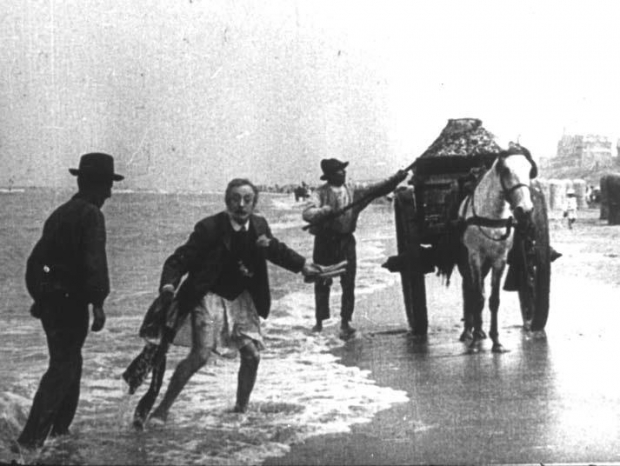
- Screenshot of the French gentleman encountering the policeman.
- Directed by: Willy Mullens
- Starring: Willy Mullens
- Cinematography: Albert Mullens
- Distributed by: Alberts Frères
- Release date: 1905
- Running time: 6 minutes
- Country: Netherlands
- Language: Silent (in Dutch)

The Misadventure of a French Gentleman Without Pants at the Zandvoort Beach (Dutch: De mésaventure van een Fransch heertje zonder pantalon aan het strand te Zandvoort) is a 1905 early Dutch silent film directed by Willy Mullens, and produced by Alberts Frères. A six-minute short comedy film (really a slapstick), it is one of the oldest surviving Dutch fictional films. When the Netherlands Film Festival presented its canon of Dutch cinema (containing sixteen monumental films in Dutch film history) in 2007, it included this film.

== Plot ==
The Misadventure of a French Gentleman Without Pants at the Zandvoort Beach (1905)

A bather, played by Willy Mullens, who is lounging in a beach chair, is surprised by a sudden surge of water. He quickly removes his pants to keep them dry. A policeman is not pleased, and trouble ensues, drawing the attention of a growing crowd. The bather attempts to escape by disguising himself as a woman and flees across the village but is eventually caught by the collar. A crowd of onlookers and a musical band accompany his arrest.

== Production ==
The film was shot on location in Zandvoort by Willy and Albert Mullens. Filming was completed in one day, on 22 July 1905 (another source has 21 July). The narrator/explicator of the film was Willy Mullens.

The first major problem arose before the shooting even started: the actor hired to play the gentleman was not allowed to do so by his fiancée, who lived in Zandvoort. As a result, Willy Mullens had to play the part himself. A second problem occurred at the end: the final scene is a chase, during which the pantless gentleman knocks over a few beach chairs, being chased by an extra dressed as a policeman. The real policeman guarding the beach area did not take kindly to the spectacle (naked legs were illegal at the time) and took the entire crew to the local police office to sort matters out.

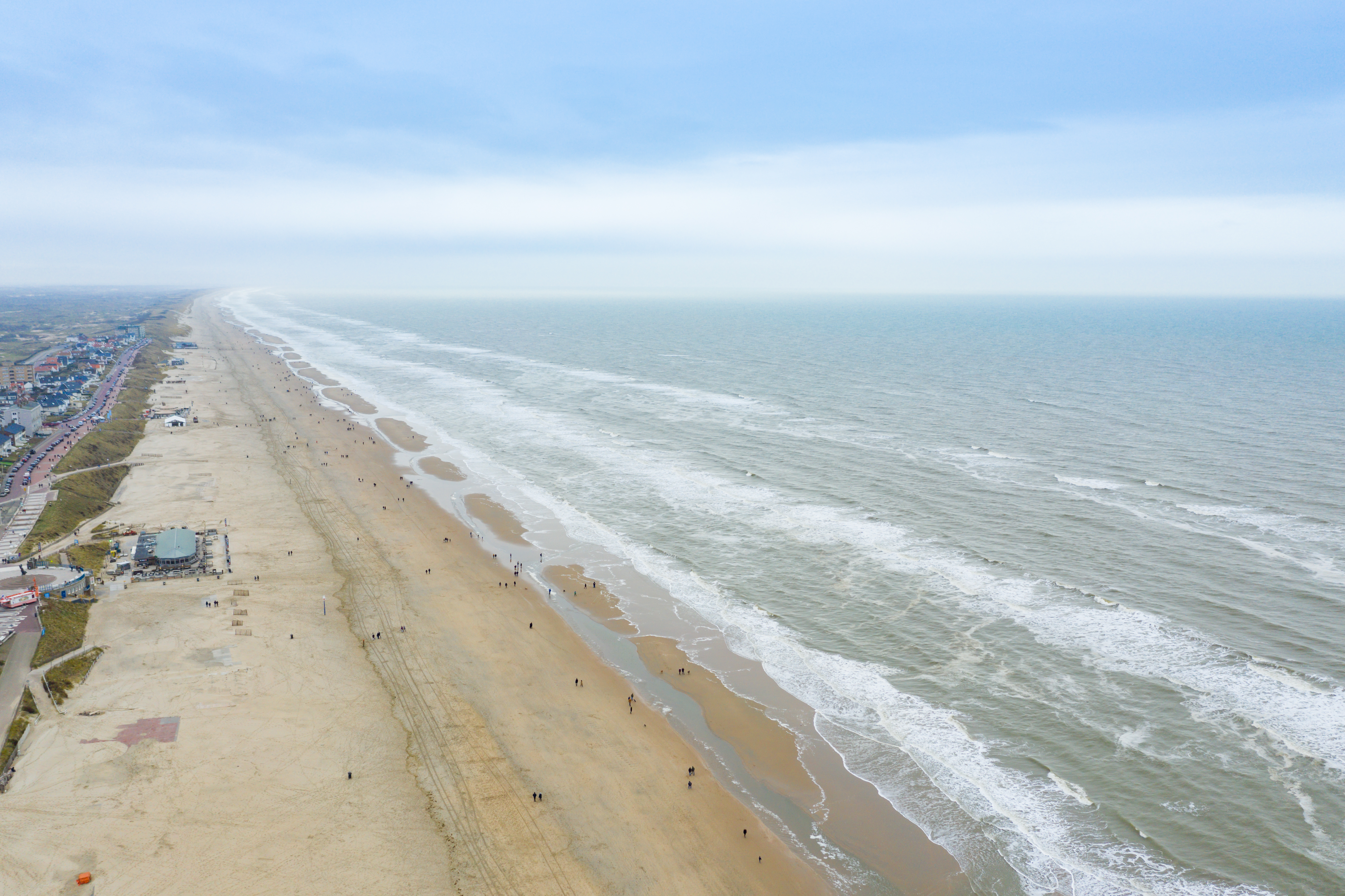
Zandvoort beach today

The story quickly spread in the then small beach resort, and after 24 July the national press started running stories about the moral degeneration in Zandvoort, as if what is depicted in the film had been an actual event—there being little real news to report during the summer months—with headlines containing words like "godless," "anarchist," and "heathen". One newspaper's headline was "Movie causes moral degeneration." The brothers had color posters printed, announcing that the truth would be shown in their movie theater; they used the current title as well as the alternate "Tragic Scene of a French Gentleman at the Zandvoort Beach." The result was, of course, free publicity, even if probably unintended by the film makers.

Other free publicity was generated by including the crowd of spectators in the scene, as the pantless gentleman is being taken away: the Mullens brothers were counting on those spectators wanting to see themselves on film.

The movie, aided by the publicity, quickly became a big hit, and was soon shown also in Zandvoort's "Olympia Circus Theater," to sell-out crowds.

== Related works ==
The Misadventure of a French Gentleman was not the last movie made by Alberts Frères to generate headlines. On Friday, 13 September 1907, they had filmed a practical joke in Maastricht, in which an actor by the name of Tünnes (from the local Schmidt theater), pulling a donkey by a rope, took off from the local market carrying a suckling pig under his arm without having paid for it. He proceeded to visit the vegetable stands, and the scene erupts with screaming housemaids, flying baskets and vegetables, and a number of police officers.

== See also ==
- List of Dutch films before 1910
