= Attack on a China Mission =

1900 British film by James Williamson

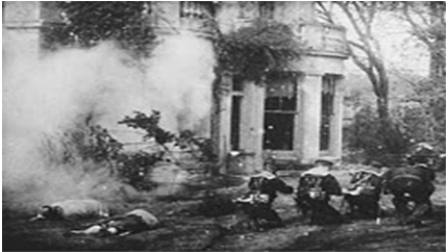
- Screenshot from the film
- Directed by: James Williamson
- Produced by: James Williamson
- Starring: Mr. James; Mr. Lepard; Florence Williamson
- Cinematography: James Williamson
- Production company: Williamson Kinematograph Company
- Release date: 17 November 1900
- Running time: 1 min 25 secs
- Country: United Kingdom
- Language: Silent

Attack on a China Mission is a 1900 British short silent drama film, directed by James Williamson, showing some sailors coming to the rescue of the wife of a missionary killed by Boxers. The four-shot film, according to Michael Brooke of BFI Screenonline, was innovative in content and technique. It incorporated a reverse-angle cut and at least two dozen performers, whereas most dramatic films of the era consisted of single-figure casts and very few shots. Film historian John Barnes claims Attack on a China Mission had "the most fully developed narrative" of any English film up to that time."

== Production ==
Attack on a China Mission (1900)

The director, inspired by Georges Méliès' influential eleven-scene dramatised documentary L'Affaire Dreyfus (1899), made the film to meet a perceived public demand for footage of the Boxer Rebellion, which began in the early months of 1900, at a derelict house called Ivy Lodge in Hove, where, according to Michael Brooke, "he went to considerable lengths to ensure that his film appeared to be authentic, kitting out the house with a bilingual Anglo-Chinese 'Mission Station' sign and drawing on his background as a chemist in order to fake gunshots and explosions."

== Premiere ==
The film was premiered at Hove Town Hall on 17 November 1900, where, according to Michael Brooke, it, "was such a success that the audience (fruitlessly) demanded a repeat screening there and then."

== Preservation ==
Just under half of the original 230 feet (70 m) of footage survives, but, according to Michael Brooke, "it includes material from all four shots, and, despite some obvious trims (the initial forcing of the gate is missing, and the wife's appeal on the balcony to the sailors must surely have lasted more than one second), enough remains to give a good account of what the original audience must have seen."
