= John Alfred Vinter =

British painter (1828–1905)

John Alfred Vinter (1828–1905) was a British painter.

== Life ==
John Alfred Vinter was born c. 1828.

He worked as a painter and lithographer of portraits and genre scenes.

He died on 28 May 1905 and was buried on the western side of Highgate Cemetery.

== Works ==
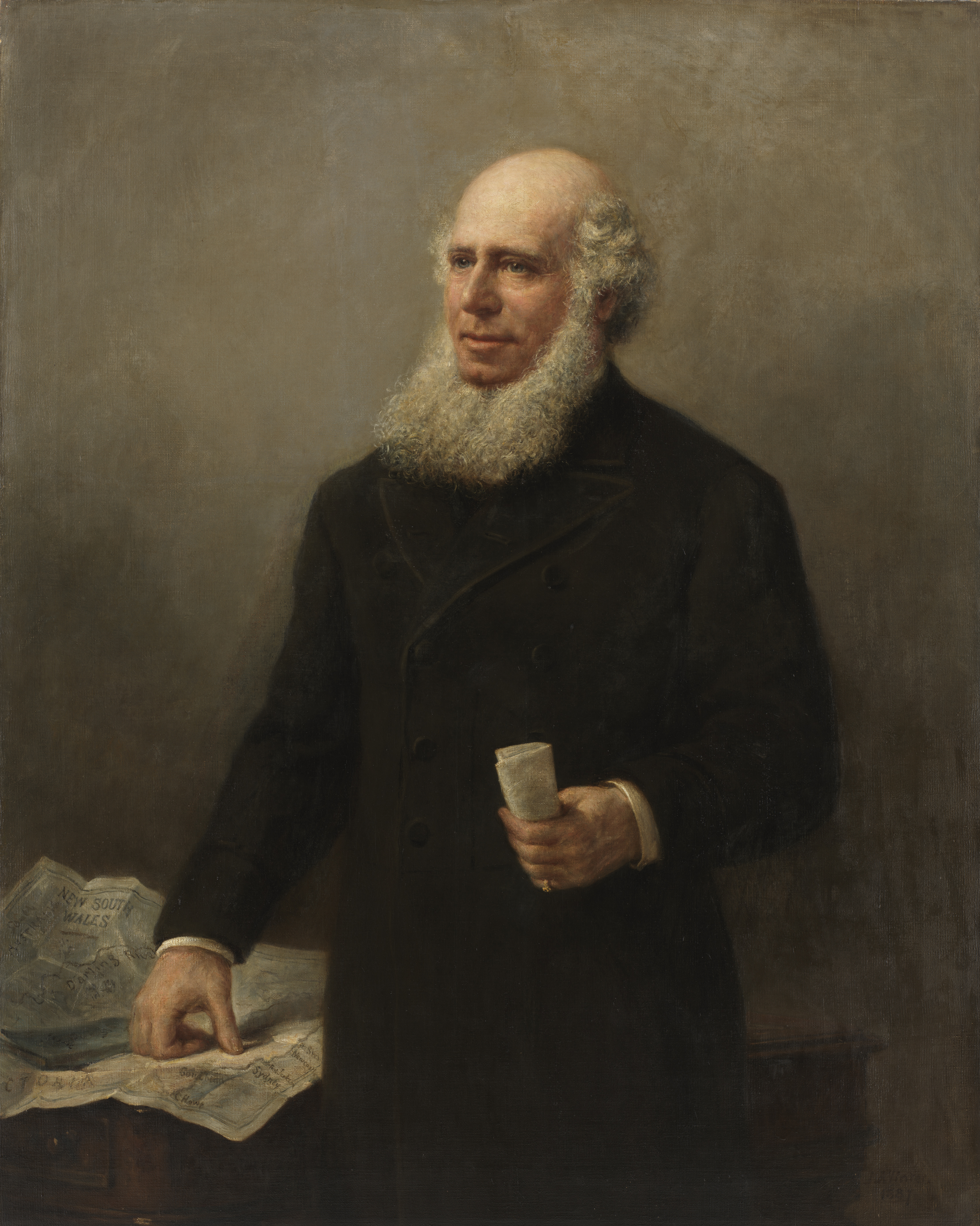
Sir Saul Samuel, Agent General for New South Wales, 1887, by Vinter

- State Library of New South Wales, Sir Saul Samuel, 1887, oil painting, ML 458
- London (National Portrait Gallery): Sir Rowland Hill (c. 1879), oil on canvas, from an anonymous photograph.
