= Alberts Frères =

Dutch film production company

Alberts Frères, founded around 1899, was one of the first film production companies in the Netherlands. The company was founded by brothers Albert (1879–1941) and Willy Mullens (1880–1952); they were the main filmmakers and exhibitors in the Netherlands in the first two decades of the twentieth century.

== History ==
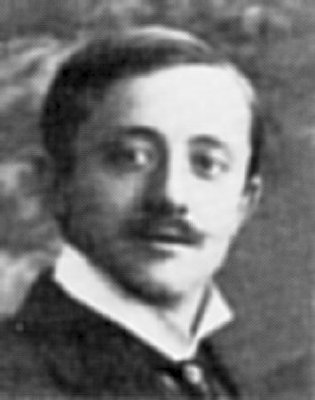
Willy Mullens

Willy and Albert's father, Albertus Abraham Mullens (30 July 1847 Hoorn – 1890), alias "A. Alber(t)", and a German by the name of Ernst Ahrens Basch (1838–1908) had founded a theater company, Koninklijk Nederlandsch Cagliostro-Théâtre Alber & Basch, specializing in "mysterious and pseudo-scientific spectacles". After Albert Senior's death, their mother, Christina Mullens-Verpoort, continued to direct the company. Christina took her sons to Paris, where they saw Auguste and Louis Lumière's films in the Salon Indien du Grand Café. With financial aid from their mother, they bought a number of films and started to show them in the Netherlands. They chose the French name "Alberts Frères" since the film business at the time was predominantly French. In 1899, the company started touring the halls and theaters of the country during the winter, and quickly became one of the main attractions at fairs throughout the country.

Mullens also helped found the Nederlandsch Centraal Filmarchief (1919), the first audio-visual archive in the Netherlands.

== Production and notable films ==
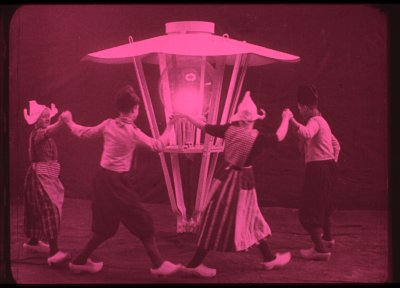
A Alberts Frères production from 1919

Beside showing films, Alberts Frères quickly started making them. An early film which generated headlines was made in Maastricht. On Friday, 13 September 1907, the brothers had filmed a practical joke in Maastricht, in which an actor by the name of Tünnes (from the local Schmidt theater), pulling a donkey by a rope, took off from the local market carrying a suckling pig under his arm without having paid for it. He proceeded to visit the vegetable stands, and the scene erupts with screaming housemaids, flying baskets and vegetables, and a number of police officers.

Their most successful production is also one of the oldest surviving Dutch fictional films, The Misadventure of a French Gentleman Without Pants at the Zandvoort Beach, made in 1905, which in 2007 was "canonized" as one of sixteen canonical films by the Netherlands Film Festival.

Willy Mullens later became a well-known producer of documentary films; his Holland Neutraal: Leger en Vlootfilm (1917) received a royal premiere, in the presence of Queen Wilhelmina and Prince Hendrik. The two and a half hour long film, which showcased the Dutch army and navy, was commissioned by the Dutch Minister of War Bosboom, and was intended to rally popular support for Dutch neutrality during World War I; on the other hand, the film, with its display of military might, also aimed to show that the Dutch, despite their neutrality, were not to be thought of lightly. During World War I the company was hired by Kaiser Wilhelm's Dutch legate to film German children celebrating Queen Wilhelmina's birthday in 1919. The German Bild- und Filmamt, which aimed at the production of propaganda, was to procure copies for the German market, in hopes of maintaining good relations between Germany and the Netherlands. It is not known if this actually happened.
