= Willy Mullens =

Dutch producer, director, and promoter of movies

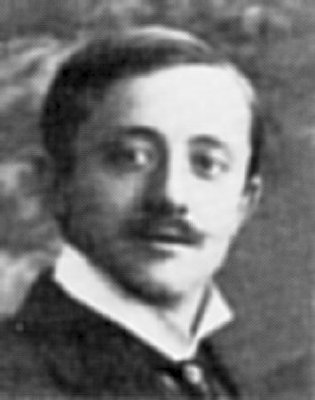
Willy Mullens.

Willy Mullens (4 October 1880, Weesp, North Holland - 21 April 1952, The Hague) was a Dutch producer, director, and promoter of movies. He is considered to be one of the early pioneers of Dutch cinema, and one of his movies was recently elected as one of only sixteen "Canonical Dutch movies." With his brother Bernardus Albertus (Albert) (20 June 1879, Harlingen - 1941) he started around the turn of the 20th century one of the earliest Dutch film production companies, Alberts Frères. By the second decade of that century he was making documentary films that premiered for royalty. His second company, Haghefilm, dominated the Dutch film market between the two World Wars.

== Entrance into the movie industry ==
=== Early career ===
Willy and Albert's father, Albertus Abraham Mullens (30 July 1847 Hoorn - 1890), alias "A. Alber(t)", and a German by the name of Ahrens Basch had founded a theater company (Koninklijk Nederlandsch Cagliostro-Théâtre Alber & Basch"), specializing in "mysterious and pseudo-scientific spectacles". After Albert Senior's death, their mother Christina Mullens-Verpoort continued to direct the company. Before getting started in the movies, Willy Mullens also worked at a fair in The Hague as a human cannonball. He was fired in 1897 when his act failed; he had been knocked out by a kangaroo. Christina took her sons to Paris, where they saw Auguste and Louis Lumière's movies in the Salon Indien du Grand Café. With financial aid from their mother, they bought a number of those movies; in 1899 they started showing them in the Netherlands in their traveling cinema. They chose the French name "Alberts Frères" for their production company, since the movie business at the time was predominantly French.

=== Alberts Frères ===
In 1914, the company started touring the halls and theaters of the country during the winter, and soon became one of the main attractions at fairs throughout the country.

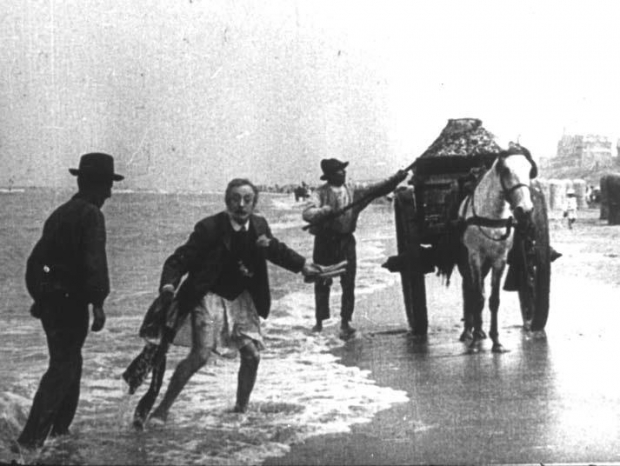
The Misadventure of a French Gentleman Without Pants at the Zandvoort Beach (1905)

Besides showing movies, Alberts Frères quickly started making them. Often focusing on comedy, the Mullens brothers pulled practical jokes and filmed them, and along the way generated headlines and built a reputation. Their most successful production is also one of the oldest surviving Dutch fictional movies, The Misadventure of a French Gentleman Without Pants at the Zandvoort Beach, which in 2007 was "canonized" as one of sixteen canonical films by the Netherlands Film Festival. The six-minute film, consisting of eight scenes, was filmed by Albert and directed by Willy, the latter also playing the lead after the intended actor was not allowed (by his fiancée) to appear pantless on-camera.

During World War I (the Netherlands were neutral), the company was hired by Kaiser Wilhelm's Dutch legate to film German children celebrating Queen Wilhelmina's birthday in 1919. The German Bild- und Filmamt (which aimed at the production of propaganda) was to procure copies for the German market, in hopes of maintaining good relations between Germany and the Netherlands; it is not known if that actually happened.

=== Haghefilm ===
"Haghefilm" (named for "The Hague") was founded by Willy Mullens in 1914, and quickly established a reputation as the largest and best-known Dutch movie production company. Willy Mullens later became a well-known producer of documentary films; his Holland Neutraal: Leger en Vlootfilm (1917) received a royal premiere, in the presence of Queen Wilhelmina and Prince Hendrik. The two and a half hour long movie was the first documentary which attracted a mass audience. It showcased the Dutch army and navy and was commissioned by the Dutch Minister of War Bosboom, who intended for the movie to rally popular support for Dutch neutrality during World War I; on the other hand, the movie, with its display of military might, also aimed to show that the Dutch, despite their neutrality, were not to be thought of lightly. During World War II, Haghefilm delivered subtitles for the Dutch version of the Die Deutsche Wochenschau, the official German-supplied newsreel.

Twice Mullens traveled to the Dutch East Indies, in 1924 to film for the oil industry, and in 1926 on assignment by the Dutch government, a nine-month trip; his were some of the first images shot in the Dutch colony.

The company also produced cinema newsreels, and were an early competitor of Polygoon, the company that operated from 1919 to 1987 and dominated the Dutch market after World War II.

=== Legacy ===
Besides being canonized by the Netherlands Film Institute and honored as a movie pioneer, Mullens also had a very practical impact on Dutch cinema as one of the founders of the Nederlandsch Centraal Filmarchief (1919), the first audio-visual archive in the Netherlands.

The name Haghefilm still lives on in the modern film laboratory called Haghefilm, in Amsterdam. Their origins date back to 1926-27, to the lab founded by Willy Mullens in The Hague. Its name was changed to "Color Film Center" in 1977-78, then folded in 1984 due to mismanagement and competition. Four of the employees became directors of their own enterprise and acquired the rights to the Haghefilm name; their lab now devotes itself to working on archival films.

== Filmography ==
- Holland Neutraal: De Leger- en Vlootfilm. 1917.
- Petroleum Film. 1924.
- L'Archipel des Indes Orientales Néerlandaises filmé par l'Institut Colonial - Amsterdam... and other short films. 1926.
- Zuiderzeewerken. 1927-1932.

=== Alphabetical ===
1. Amsterdamsche pleinen en straten (1920) 10:51
2. L'Archipel des Indes Orientales Néerlandaises filmé par l'Institut Colonial - Amsterdam (1926)
3. Arnhem en omstreken (1919) 24:48
4. Bolsward (1920) 4:22
5. De ambachtsheerlijkheid Rijswijk (1920) 8:20
6. De bereiding van boter (1920) 27:01
7. De bereiding van kaas (1920) 19:50
8. De Vechtstreek (1920) 4:36
9. Delft (1922) 21:37
10. Door Walcheren (1921) 22:31
11. Dordrecht, Holland's aelteste Stadt (1926, reel 1 of 3) 12:37
12. Een oud keizerrijk (1920) 11:25
13. Eindhoven (1920) 7:20
14. Enkhuizen (1919) 8:54
15. Franeker (1920) 7:25
16. Glas-industrie in Leerdam (1918) 14:42
17. Harlingen (1920) 5:44
18. Heerlen (1922) 21:35
19. Het leven der bijen (1917) 25:13
20. Het 's-Gravenhaagsche vacantie-kinderfeest (1920) 5:23
21. Holland in ijs (1917) 8:35
22. Holland Neutraal: De Leger- en Vlootfilm (1917)
23. Hoorn (1919) 9:09
24. In een ver verleden in en om Arnhem (1919) 3:05
25. Kampen (1920) 14:15
26. Koninklijke Stearine Kaarsenfabriek Gouda (1918) (long version: 23:45)
27. Koninklijke Stearine Kaarsenfabriek Gouda (1918) (short version: 13:56)
28. Langs de Maas (1920) 8:16
29. Langs Gouwe en Oude Rijn (1920) 5:04
30. Leeuwarden (1920) 12:38
31. Maastricht (1920) 12:50
32. Medemblik (1920) 10:01
33. Moderne wegenaanleg te Amsterdam (1927) 56:16
34. Mooi Nederland Zeist (1922) 9:09
35. Nederlandsche Basalt Maatschappij (1925) 50:13
36. Petroleum Film (1924)
37. Schoonhoven (1920) 8:33
38. Sittard (1920) 9:20
39. Sneek (1920) 9:15
40. Stavoren (1920) 5:20
41. Utrecht (1918) 22:16
42. Valkenburg (1920) 4:34
43. Visschersplaatsen aan de Zuiderzee (1920) 9:14
44. Weesp (1920) 8:17
45. Werkspoor (1918) 2:19
46. Zaltbommel (1919) 10:38
47. Zuiderzeewerken (1927-1932)
