= The Seven Ages (film) =

1905 American silent comedy film

- Directed by: Edwin S. Porter
- Cinematography: Edwin S. Porter
- Production company: Edison Manufacturing Company
- Release date: 27 February 1905
- Running time: 5 min.
- Country: United States
- Language: Silent

The Seven Ages is a 1905 American silent comedy film, directed by Edwin S. Porter inspired by the monologue All the World's a Stage in William Shakespeare's comedy As You Like It.

== Plot ==
The film follows broadly the structure of Jaques' monologue All the World's a Stage in William Shakespeare's comedy As You Like It and show six scenes of couples kissing each other at different ages: Infancy, Playmates, Schoolmates, Lovers (in some versions: The Soldier), The Judge, and Second Childhood. A contrasting scene titled What Age? shows a woman of indefinite age dreamily stroking her cat.

== Production and release ==
Some of the copies included two tinted scenes.

== Analysis ==
The film is composed of seven scenes introduced by intertitles (quoted in italics below). Scenes 1 and 3 include one wide shot, scene 6 includes one medium shot, and scenes 2, 4, 5 and 7 are composed of one wide shot and one medium close-up.

1. Infancy. One wide shot. A little baby is crying. A little girl brings him a bottle and kisses him

2. Playmates. One wide shot. One medium close-up. A little boy tries to kiss a little girl holding her doll. She first resists but finally lets herself be kissed.

3. Schoolmates. One wide shot. A teenage girl is reading under a tree. A boy enters and sits next to her. They kiss each other.

4. Lovers. One wide shot. One medium close-up. A young woman comes out of a house and sits waiting on a bench. A soldier enters behind her and puts his hands on her eyes. They kiss each other.

5. The Judge. One wide shot. One medium close-up. A middle-aged couple with three children sitting in a parlour. The children kiss their parents good night and leave. The parents kiss each other.

6. What age? One medium close-up. A woman of indefinite age is sitting down patting dreamily her cat. She takes her in her arms and kisses her on the head.

7. Second Childhood. One wide shot. One medium close-up. Sitting by a fireplace, an old man helps an old woman make a ball of wool while a cat laps milk from a saucer. They kiss each other.

The film presents an original structure, between tableaux films where every shot constitutes a scene rather independent from the others and later films where the shots compose scenes included in a logical narrative. Here, "the purpose is not to follow the adventures of a character step by step but to illustrate, metaphorically, the various stages of life". Three of the tableaux-scenes were actually sold to distributors as separate subjects, Engagement Ring, Old Sweethearts, and Old Maid and Pet Cat. Wanda Strauven notes that the film may be non narrative in its editorial structure but it has a "logical diachronic structure. (...) The succession of shots does not privilege the unexpected or defy any kind of logical succession of scenes and images, but is rather based on what David Bordwell and Kristin Thompson call categorical editing. A kind of logic even if it is not narrative logic, is at work."

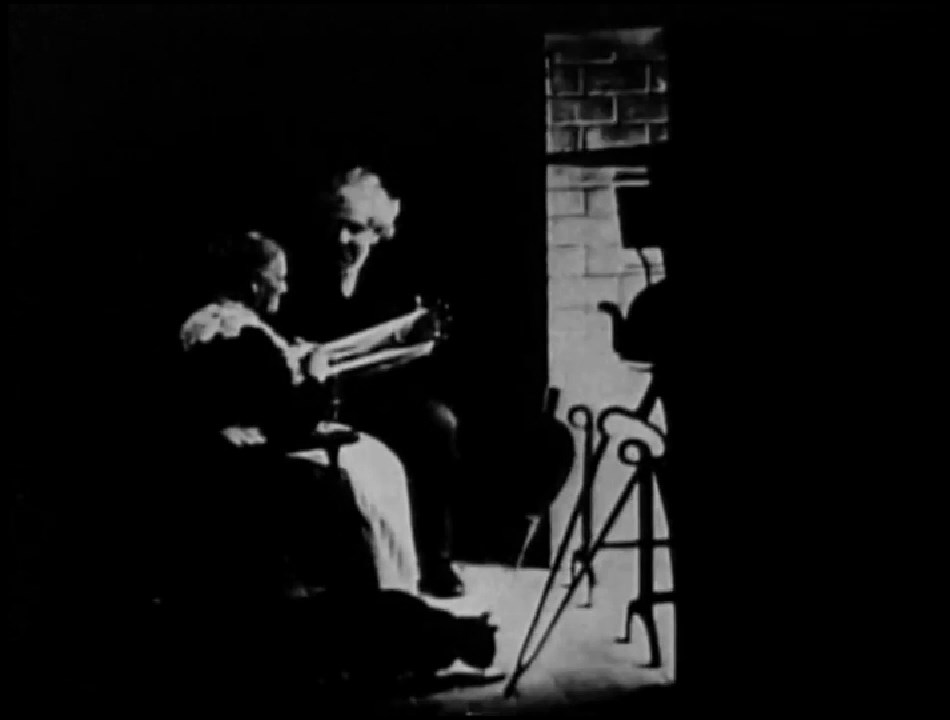
Scene 7

The film has been noted by various authors as probably the first example of the use of directional lighting in cinema to produce a specific effect. Barry Salt remarks that " It was around 1905 that the major film producing companies, Edison, Vitagraph. and Biograph, began to use artificial lighting in their studios (and that) there was also from this time some extremely rare use of theatrical type arc floodlights". He mentions as "one striking instance (and) possibly the first appearance of such a usage", the last scene of The Seven Ages where "the light from a fire falling on two old people sitting in front of a fireplace is simulated by an arc floodlight in the position of the fire and out of shot to the side (and) is the sole source of light in this scene." Tom Gunning mentions that Porter used this technique "to indicate a fireplace's glow, with pictorially striking profile and back lighting. Porter's firelit shot is a gem from pre-Griffith cinema and certainly creates connotations of warmth and security in this tableau of love in old age."

Vicky Lebeau remarks that the second scene, with a close-up of two children kissing each other, is "explicitly troping the very popular Edison short The Mary Irwin Kiss (1896), (and) also draws on an established iconography of the child as one who likes to mime the worlds of adults, playing at being 'grown-up' (...). Evoking as they do not only the children's libidinal pleasure in one another (if that is what it is) but also the child's sexual interest in the adult world, such images bring into focus the difficult relation between adult and child on the issue of sexuality".

== See also ==
- Edwin S. Porter filmography
