= In the Swimming Pool, Palm Beach, Florida =

- Produced by: American Mutoscope & Biograph Company
- Cinematography: G. W. Bitzer
- Distributed by: American Mutoscope & Biograph Company; Kleine Optical Company
- Release date: February 1905
- Running time: 169 feet; 3 minutes, 2 seconds
- Country: USA
- Language: English..(Silent - but has no title cards)

In the Swimming Pool, Palm Beach, Florida is a 1905 silent short actuality/documentary film photographed by G. W. Bitzer. It was produced and distributed by the American Mutoscope and Biograph Company. It is a surviving film.
