= 2 A. M. in the Subway =

1905 American film

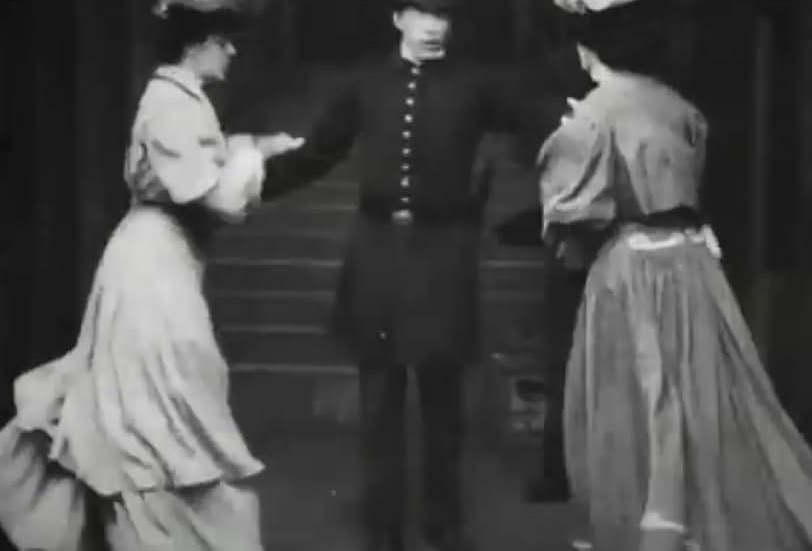
- Film still
- Directed by: Billy Bitzer
- Starring: Sidney Olcott
- Release date: 1905
- Running time: 53 sec
- Country: United States

2 A. M. in the Subway is a one shot, 53 second-long comedy filmed, and probably directed, by Billy Bitzer on June 5, 1905 at the American Mutoscope and Biograph Company's (AM&B) studio on 14th Street in New York City. Likely intended as a slightly racy, and therefore rather typical, subject for AM&B's peepshow machine, The Mutoscope, 2 A. M. in the Subway is a vignette of New York City's night life that still resonates with New Yorkers more than a century later.

== Plot summary ==
2 A. M. in the Subway (1905)

A tired cop and a subway conductor are seen waiting at a subway platform, late at night. The conductor opens the doors to the train at left, and out steps an obviously drunk man, played by Sidney Olcott, carried between two women in fancy dress. The cop begins to mix it up with the three of them, and they are interrupted by another man in a bowler hat; he is carrying a large package and steps onto the train to the right after greeting the two women and the drunk man. One of the women steps forward into the frame and lifts up her skirt so that the drunk man can tie her shoe. This gets the attention of the cop, who hustles the three of them onto the train; meanwhile what appears to be a pair of bare legs stick out from a window of a train car and are quickly withdrawn. The cop just manages to notice this, and calls all parties back out to the platform where it is revealed that the man in the bowler hat has a pair of department store mannequin's legs with him.

== Historical background ==
On May 21, 1905, Billy Bitzer had made his film Interior N.Y. subway, 14th St. to 42nd St. from the front of a New York City Subway car; at that point the Subway itself had been open only seven months. The very day that subject was submitted for copyright, this one was made at the Biograph studio; it was copyrighted on 20 June. Although the six actors involved are unidentified, aside from Sidney Olcott, the action is obviously tightly coordinated in order to get all of the action into such a short subject.

AM&B sent two paper prints of this film for copyright, and the better of the two copies was rephotographed for preservation.
