= The Big Swallow =

1901 British film by James Williamson

- Directed by: James Williamson
- Starring: Sam Dalton
- Cinematography: James Williamson
- Production company: Williamson Kinematograph Company
- Release date: 15 October 1901
- Running time: 1 min 8 secs
- Country: United Kingdom
- Language: Silent

The Big Swallow (AKA: A Photographic Contortion) is a 1901 British silent comic trick film, directed by James Williamson, featuring a man, irritated by the presence of a photographer, who solves his dilemma by swallowing him and his camera whole. The three-shot trick film is, according to Michael Brooke of BFI Screenonline, "one of the most important early British films in that it was one of the first to deliberately exploit the contrast between the eye of the camera and of the audience watching the final film".

The "tricks" used to produce the film were described in detail in Frederick A. Talbot's 1912 book Moving Pictures: How They Are Made and Worked.

== Reviews ==
BFI Screenonline reviewer Michael Brooke points out that despite being "less bitten by the trick-film bug than his contemporaries", the director "made one of the most striking genre entries", taking the concept of extreme close-up photography pioneered by George Albert Smith in Grandma's Reading Glass and Spiders on a Web (both 1900) "a stage further by featuring a man advancing towards the camera, remaining in more or less perfect focus until his mouth appears to swallow the lens".

Although the director's "purpose was primarily comic (and doubtless inspired by unwanted attention from increasingly savvy passers-by while filming his actuality shorts)", he produces "one of the most striking genre entries" and "makes imaginative use of an extreme close-up to create one of the seminal images of early British (and world) cinema, as effective in its way as the slashed eyeball of Un Chien Andalou (1929), and of just as much appeal to the Surrealist movement".

The film, however, "might have been still more effective if Williamson had omitted the second and third shots", in which he "cuts to the photographer apparently disappearing into a black void, and then back to the man who retires munching him up and expressing great satisfaction, "since they detract from the logical purity of the first, ending on a completely blank screen as the swallowed camera is no longer able to function as a surrogate for the audience's point of view".
