= The Night Before Christmas (1905 film) =

American silent short film

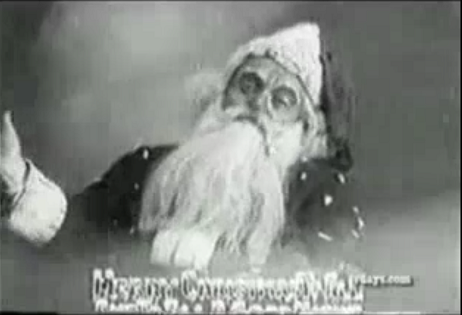
- Santa Claus at the end of the film
- Directed by: Edwin S. Porter
- Written by: Clement Clarke Moore (poem)
- Starring: Harry Eytinge
- Cinematography: Edwin S. Porter
- Distributed by: Edison Manufacturing Company
- Release date: December 16, 1905
- Running time: 9:00 (800 feet)
- Country: United States
- Language: English

The Night Before Christmas (1905).

The Night Before Christmas is a 1905 American silent short film directed by Edwin S. Porter for the Edison Manufacturing Company. It closely follows Clement Clarke Moore's 1823 poem Twas the Night Before Christmas, and was the first film production of the poem.

== Plot summary ==
Scenes are introduced using lines of the poem. Santa Claus, played by Harry Eytinge, is shown feeding real reindeer and finishes his work in the workshop. Meanwhile, the children of a city household hang their stockings and go to bed, but unable to sleep they engage in a pillow fight. Santa Claus leaves his home on a sleigh with his reindeer. He enters the children's house through the chimney and leaves the presents. The children come down the stairs and enjoy their Christmas presents.

== Production ==
1,670 ft of film was shot, with 798 ft used. A panoramic shot of Santa Claus riding his sleigh over hills and the moon was shot using miniatures and a painted backdrop. The film is available on the Kino DVD A Christmas Past.

== See also ==
- List of Christmas films
- Santa Claus in film
