= The White Caps =

1905 American silent drama film

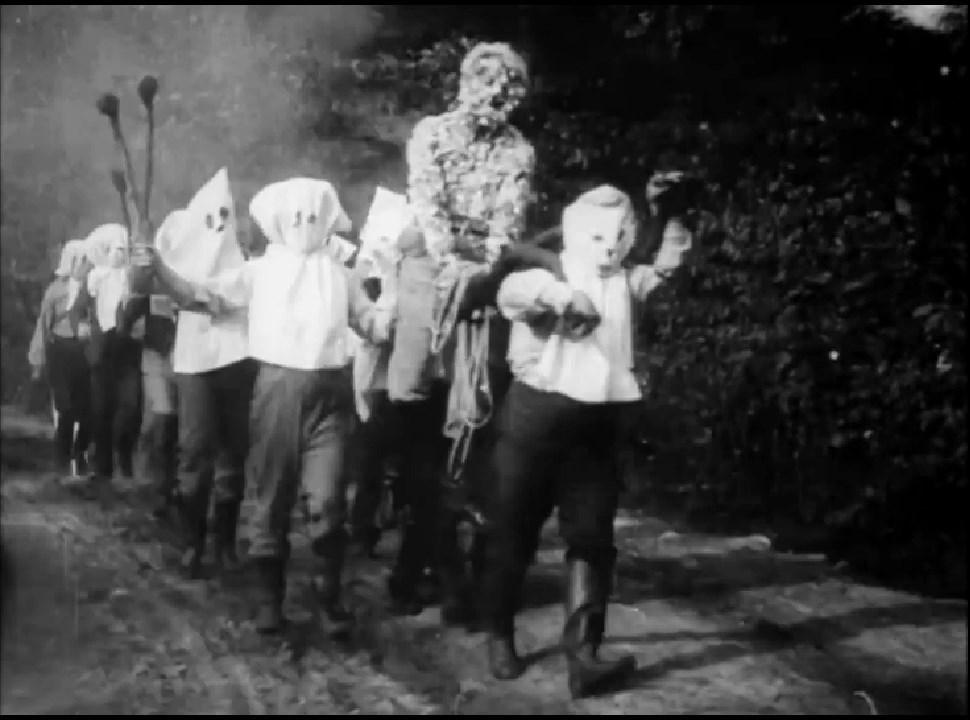
- Screenshot: The wife-beater tarred and feathered by the White Caps
- Directed by: Wallace McCutcheon and Edwin S. Porter
- Starring: Kate Toncray; John R. Cumpson
- Cinematography: Edwin S. Porter
- Production company: Edison Manufacturing Company
- Release date: September 1905
- Running time: 12 min.
- Country: United States
- Language: Silent

The White Caps is a 1905 American silent drama film, directed by Wallace McCutcheon and Edwin S. Porter showing how a man abusing his wife is punished by a group of white-hooded men. It is one of the first American films exposing conjugal violence against women and showing the action of vigilante groups.

== Plot ==
Two members of a vigilante group known as 'The White Caps' post a warning sign on a man's home. When the man comes home, he tears down the sign and begins abusing his wife both verbally and physically.

The wife flees from the home with her child to find a place of refuge. When the vigilantes find out, they arm themselves with rifles before confronting the abusive husband. After a chase, the abusive husband is tarred and feathered before being expelled from the community.

== Cast ==
- Kate Toncray as The wife
- Lionel Barrymore or John Wade as The abusive husband
- John R. Cumpson
- Arthur V. Johnson

== Production ==
The film was shot on location in August 1905 in Demarest and Fort Lee in New Jersey.

The film was inspired by Thomas Dixon's controversial novel The Clansman published in 1905 and whose theatre adaptation was in Broadway rehearsal at the time of production of the film. The play, which presented the Ku Klux Klan as a "force for regeneration", would become ten years later the main inspiration for D.W. Griffith's film The Birth of a Nation. While the Ku Klux Klan had almost disappeared after 1872 (its revival would be rekindled in 1915 by Griffith's film), other vigilante groups such as the White Caps were active in the Midwest and border states at the turn of the century.

Charles Musser mentions that White Caps members, "generally faced with declining income and political power, acted as agents of social control, punishing offences that the state and local governments failed to address adequately. He remarks that while The White Caps "avoids the overt racism of Dixon’s novel, it depicts and even accepts a pattern of alternative justice that supports it." Porter had already expressed his doubts about what he regarded as corrupt traditional justice in his film The Kleptomaniac released earlier in 1905. Musser contrasts the methods used to influence spectators in The White Caps and in The Birth of a Nation. McCutcheon and Porter "assumed that the viewers’ moral outrage at the husband's behavior would lead them to condemn the drunkard and condone his punishment", thereby implicitly justifying other actions by the vigilante groups, who after the Civil War increasingly targeted black victims. On the other hand, Griffith, in order "to convert people to his beliefs in white supremacy, did not assume shared attitudes and effectively used parallel editing to force his audience into identifying with the Klan."

== Release and reception ==
The film was released in September 1905. The Edison company advertisements presented the film as follows: "The 'Vigilantes' during the gold excitement of (18)49 in California and the 'White Caps' of more recent years in Ohio, Indiana and other Western States, are well-known organisations which dealt summarily with outlaws and the criminal classes in general. We have portrayed in Motion Pictures, in a most vivid and realistic manner, the method employed by the 'White Caps' to rid the community of undesirable citizens."

The film was also advertised as "The Ku Klux Klan or White Caps. The Greatest of all sensational pictures", presenting the vigilantes as "law abiding citizens (...) compelled to secretly organise themselves (...) to rid the community of undesirable citizens." The Portsmouth Daily Herald explained that the White Caps were "reputable citizens punishing "wife beaters, habitual drunkards, etc." The Altoona Mirror listed the film as "Punishing a wife-beater or The White Caps" and presented it as a "Warning to Wifebeaters".

== Analysis ==
The film is composed of 14 shots without any intertitles. Apart from shot 2, all shots are filmed on location. Several shots include camera panning and continuity editing is used to show actions developing over several shots.

1. The corner of a house. Two men with their heads covered by white hoods and carrying guns. The White Caps carefully approach the house. One of them sticks a poster that reads “Warning. White Caps” on the wall of the house. The hooded men leave together.

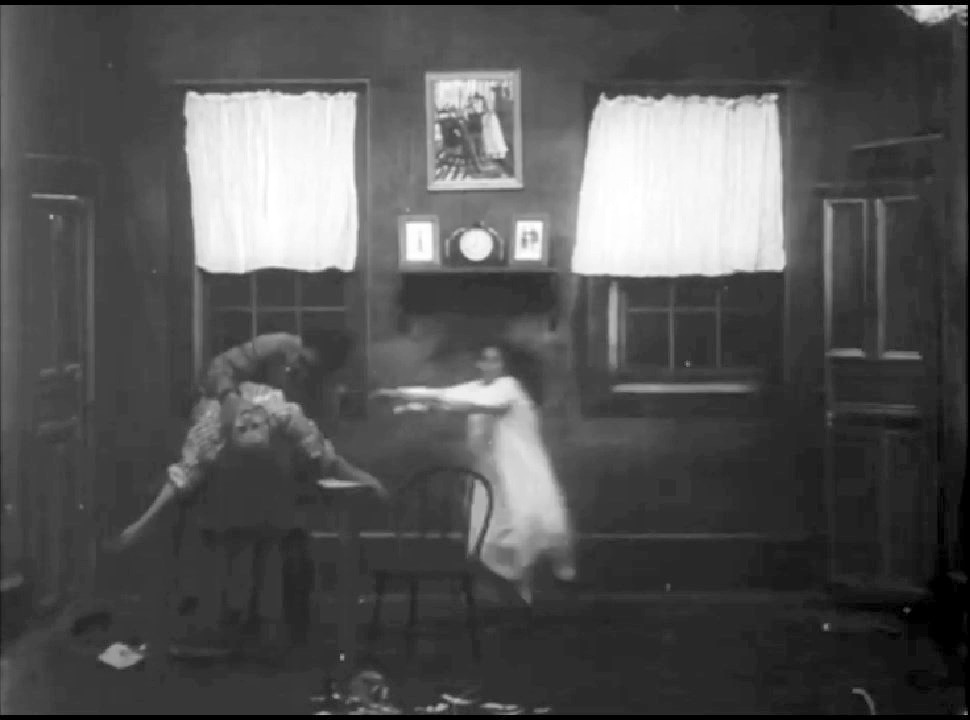
Shot 2

2. A parlour. A woman reads, sitting at a table. She goes to the window, looks through it and before sitting back at the table looking desperate. The right hand door opens and a young girl enters the room and runs to kiss her. The woman embraces her daughter before leading her out of the room. She looks through the other window and goes back to sit down. The left door opens and a man enters. Angrily, he shows her the poster that was seen in shot 1. The man tears it into pieces and starts beating her. The lamp, which was on the table, falls to the ground. The young girl enters again and pulls the man away from her mother. The woman leaves through the left door followed by the girl.

3. Same as Shot 1. The woman and the young girl come out of the door and run away. The camera pans left to follow them.

4. A country landscape with a road to the left. A horse carriage rides towards the camera. The woman and the girl come running in from the right. They wave at the man in the carriage, who helps them come aboard. The carriage leaves to the front left.

5. Another country landscape with a road. The carriage appears at the back left and comes to a halt at the front right. The man from the carriage helps the woman and the young girl to alight, and the camera pans left to follow them as they walk across a garden. The young girl is helping the woman to walk. When they reach the house, the woman can no longer walk. The young girl rushes to bang desperately at the door, while the woman climbs the stairs with difficulty to the door before fainting. The door opens and several people carry her inside.

6. The corner of the house as seen in shot 5, with a barn in the background. The camera pans left as a man waves at two other men on horseback, who bring him his horse. The three ride away at the front right.

7. Same as Shot 1. Four White Caps rush towards the house and bang at the door. The man inside opens the door before slamming it shut when he sees the four men. He appears at the window to shoot at them while The White Caps take cover and shoot back. The man shoots from a first floor window and two of the White Caps rush into the house, while the two other run to the other side of the house.

8. The other side of the house. The two White Caps hide when they see the man inside escaping through the window. They immediately overpower him, helped by the other two White Caps. They exit right.

9. A clearing in the woods. The White Caps, holding their hoods in their hands, have a discussion around a fire. They put on their hoods when the man is brought to them, his hands bound behind his back. When they untie his hands, he hits the man who was holding him and before escaping to the right. All the hooded men run behind him.

10. A path in the forest. The man enters at the back left and runs; followed by the White Caps until they all exit at the front right.

11. Another place in the forest. The White Caps, spread across the whole screen, walk towards the camera carrying torches and looking for the man.

12. The man is hiding behind a tree to the left. One of the White Caps appears to the right and walks carefully towards the tree until the man then pounces him and they start to fight. The other White Caps then come running in, knock the man unconscious, and carry him away.

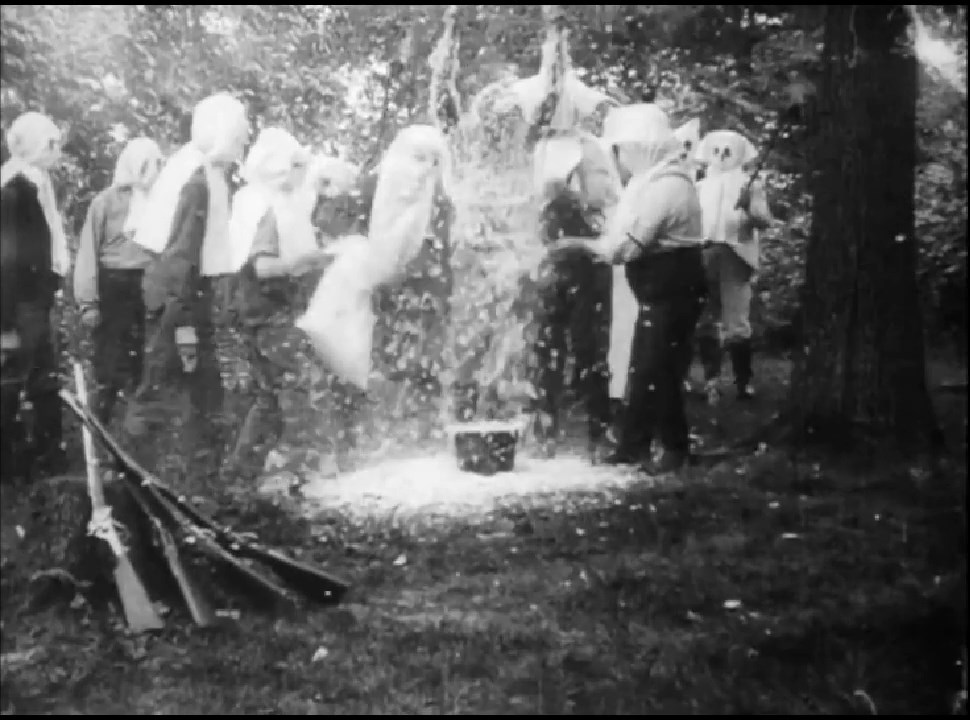
Shot 13

13. A clearing in the forest. The White Caps are assembled with their torches. The man is brought in. His feet are tied, his shirt is removed and he is covered with tar and feathers.

14. A road in the forest. A group of White Caps appears at the back left, one carrying a torch, one playing a fife and two playing drums while the others carry the man who is covered in tar and feather. All exit to the front right.

== See also ==
- Edwin S. Porter filmography
