= James Williamson (film pioneer) =

British photographer and filmmaker (1855–1933)

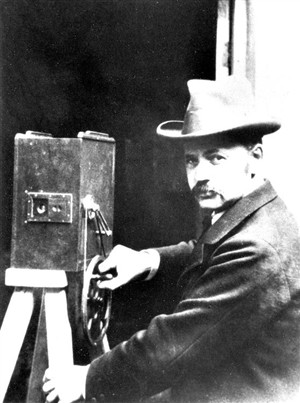
- James Williamson around 1900
- Born: 8 November 1855; Pathhead, Scotland
- Died: 18 August 1933 (aged 77); Richmond, England
- Occupation: Film maker

James A. Williamson (8 November 1855 – 18 August 1933) was a Scottish photographer and a key member of the loose association of early film pioneers dubbed the Brighton School by French film historian Georges Sadoul. He is best known for The Big Swallow (1901), a trick film with innovative use of extreme close-up, as well as Fire! and Stop Thief! (both 1901), dramas with continuity established across multiple shots.

== Biography ==
=== Early life and career ===
Williamson was born in Pathhead near Kirkcaldy, Fife, and raised in Edinburgh, where he trained to be a master chemist. He moved to London in 1868, where he was an apprentice to a pharmacist and to Eastry, Kent in 1877, where he bought his own pharmacy and got married. He was also a keen amateur photographer who sold photographic apparatus and chemical supplies in his shop and became an agent for Kodak.

In 1886, he moved his chemist's and photographic business to 144 Church Road, Hove, where he took up residence with his family, and formed friendships with fellow pioneers Esmé Collings, William Friese-Greene and George Albert Smith, among others, for whom he supplied chemicals and processed films. The property, previously owned by the photographer S. Grey of Well & Grey, was later renumbered 156 Church Road and currently bears a commemorative plaque to Williamson's achievements unveiled as part of the centenary of cinema celebrations in 1996.

Williamson, who initially purchased and adapted an apparatus for local showings of Smith's films, was, with assistance from the engineer Alfred Darling, able to construct his own home-made filming apparatus and begin making films, including the actuality Devil's Dyke Fun Fair, in time for inclusion in the Hove Camera Club's annual exhibition in November 1896, and again in November 1897. At the same time he introduced x-ray photography to the region.

=== Productions at Western Road ===
In 1898, he moved his chemist's and photographic business to 55 Western Road, Hove, where he and his family took up residence, and issued his first catalogue, which was expanded that year to include, among others, trick film The Clown Barber and comedy Washing the Sweep. These were later distributed by the Warwick Trading Company under the directorship of Charles Urban.

Williamson's Popular Entertainments, a Saturday night showing of his films, ran for five weeks from January to February 1900 and for a further four weeks from November to December at the Hove Town Hall. The latter series featured the premiere of Williamson's innovative Attack on a China Mission, which included a four shots that developed the narrative and a reverse-angle cut giving the audience an alternate perspective, as well as winter sports scenes filmed in Switzerland by mountaineer and traveller Aubrey Le Blond, described as the first identifiable female filmmaker.

Excerpt from Williamson's Fire! (1901)

Williamson, as shown by the 1901 census in which he is described as a "chemist & druggist but engaged in photography only", had entered a period of dedicated film-making during which he produced trick film The Big Swallow, with its innovative use of extreme close-up, as well as dramas Fire! and Stop Thief!, with their use of action continuity across multiple shots which established the basic grammar of film. The following year these films became available in the US where they are said to have influenced Edwin Porter's Life of an American Fireman and The Great Train Robbery (both 1903).

=== Productions at Cambridge Grove ===
In 1902, he moved his business, now named the Williamson Kinematographic Company, to a new location at Cambridge Grove off Wilbury Villas, Hove, where he and his family took up residence at Rose Cottage and a glasshouse film studio and a photographic atelier, designed by W.B. Sheppard, were constructed to house production and processing of such important works as The Little Match Seller as well as The Soldier's Return and A Reservist, Before the War, and After the War, which pioneered the use of film to promote social issues, prefiguring the genre of Social Realism. That summer he also filmed the procession and rehearsal procession for the coronation of King Edward VII.

Williamson Kinematographic Company began a period of expansion in 1907 opening new offices in London and in New York, under Williamson's son Alan. Williamson himself, like fellow pioneer Robert W. Paul, had become disillusioned with the increasingly industrialised nature of the business and left production first to Jack Chart and later to David Aylott, while he concentrated on film processing and distribution, as well as working with his son Colin, an engineer, on a new venture manufacturing and selling equipment. The following year, as part of this new venture, he invented a device which allowed exhibitors to make their own intertitles. Williamson, along with Charles Urban and other filmmakers, also attended the 1909 European Convention of Film Producers and Publishers in Paris, intended to combat the threat from the foundation of the Motion Picture Patents Company in the US, shortly before shutting down the film production and exhibition arms of his business.

=== Later life ===
In 1910, following the production of his final film, The History of a Butterfly: A Romance of Insect Life, announced as the first of an unrealised series of innovative informational films on science and nature subjects, Williamson and his family moved to London, and his premises at Cambridge Grove were sold to Charles Urban's Natural Color Kinematograph Company. That year he also patented a projector which inserted title slides into projected films. Williamson briefly returned to production in 1913 with a newsreel service which closed down shortly after the outbreak of World War I.

By this time Williamson Kinematographic Company assets included a processing plant in Barnet and a factory in Willesden, where the famous Williamson's 'Topical' cameras along with a variety of other apparatus widely used in professional British film-making at the time were manufactured. During the war the company pioneered the development of aerial photography, producing gun-mounted reconnaissance cameras to photograph aerial battles. It also developed an innovative photogrammetry camera for scientific and military use, and a photo-finish camera for horse-racing.

On 18 August 1933, Williamson died at his home in Richmond, Surrey of a heart attack.

== Legacy ==
The Williamson Kinematograph Company continued to make a range of cameras, processing and printing equipment and continued its pioneering work in aerial reconnaissance during the World War II.

The pioneering film work of James Williamson, as well as Esme Collings and George Albert Smith, was commemorated in the 1966 BBC Television programme It Began in Brighton, produced by Melvyn Bragg and directed by Tristram Powell, and in the 1968 Brighton Festival.

In 1996, as part of the celebration of the centenary of film, the work of Williamson and the other Brighton pioneers was commemorated by the unveiling of plaques, including one on Williamson's former premises in Church Street, an exhibition held at the University of Brighton Gallery and Hove Museum and the publication of Hove Pioneers and the Arrival of Cinema by John Barnes, Ine van Dooren and Frank Gray.

== Selected filmography ==
Date	Title	Credited as				Notes
Date	Title	Cinematographer	Producer	Writer	Director	Notes
1896(?)	Devil's Dyke Fun Fair	Yes	Yes		Yes	Actuality of workers and visitors to fun fair at Devil's Dyke, Sussex.
1897(?)	On the West Pier	Yes	Yes		Yes	Actuality of visitors to West Pier, Brighton.
1898	The Clown Barber	Yes	Yes	Yes	Yes	Trick film about a barber who removes a customer's head to shave it.
1898	Early Fashions on Brighton Pier	Yes	Yes		Yes	Actuality of people promenading on Brighton Pier.
1898	Washing the Sweep	Yes	Yes	Yes	Yes	Comedy featuring a chimney sweep and two washerwomen.
1900	Attack on a China Mission	Yes	Yes	Yes	Yes	Four-shot drama, featuring a reverse cut, set during the Boxer Rebellion.
1901	Are You There?	Yes	Yes	Yes	Yes	Comedy about a young man's interrupted call to his girlfriend.
1901	The Big Swallow	Yes	Yes	Yes	Yes	Three-shot trick film, with extreme close-up, of a camera and operator being swallowed.
1901	Cricket	Yes	Yes		Yes	Actuality of W.G. Grace and Prince Ranji at batting practice.
1901	Fire!	Yes	Yes	Yes	Yes	Five-shot dramatic narrative featuring firemen at work.
1901	The Magic Extinguisher	Yes	Yes	Yes	Yes	Trick film featuring magician and conical extinguisher.
1901	The Puzzled Bather and his Animated Clothes	Yes	Yes	Yes	Yes	Trick film featuring a bather unable to remove his clothes.
1901	Stop Thief!	Yes	Yes	Yes	Yes	Early chase film about a tramp who steals some meat.
1902	Ladies Cyclists	Yes	Yes		Yes	Staged performance of synchronised female cyclists.
1902	The Little Match Seller	Yes	Yes		Yes	Drama based on classic Hans Christian Andersen fable.
1902	Professor Reddish Performing his Celebrated Bicycle Dive from Brighton West Pier	Yes	Yes		Yes	Actuality of stunt performer Professor Reddish at West Pier, Brighton.
1902	A Reservist, Before the War, and After the War	Yes	Yes	Yes	Yes	Multi-shot drama about the negative effects of a soldier's war service.
1902	The Soldier's Return	Yes	Yes	Yes	Yes	Multi-shot drama about a soldier returning from war.
1904	Dear Boys Come Home for the Holidays	Yes	Yes	Yes	Yes	Comedy, featuring Williamson, about two mischievous boys.
1904	The Old Chorister	Yes	Yes	Yes	Yes	Drama, using superimposition, about an old man's reminiscence.
1905	Brown's Half Holiday	Yes	Yes	Yes	Yes	Comedy about a reluctant husband's failed attempts at DIY home improvement.
1905	An Interesting Story	Yes	Yes	Yes	Yes	Comedy about a man distracted by his book.
1905	Our New Errand Boy	Yes	Yes	Yes	Yes	Chase comedy, featuring Williamson, about a young errand boy.
1905	Two Little Waifs	Yes	Yes	Yes	Yes	Drama about a little boy rescued from kidnappers by a gypsy girl.
1906	Flying the Foam and Some Fancy Diving	Yes	Yes		Yes	Trick film adapted from earlier actuality of stunt performer Professor Reddish and high divers at West Pier, Brighton.
1906	Rival Barbers	Yes	Yes	Yes	Yes	Comedy about mistaken identity.
1908	£100 Reward	Yes	Yes	Yes	Yes	Drama about a dog that earns a reward for solving a burglary.
1910	The History of a Butterfly: A Romance of Insect Life	Yes	Yes	Yes	Yes	Natural history film about the life-cycle of the butterfly.
