= List of horror films of the 1890s =

This is a list of horror films released in the 1890s

== List ==
Horror films released in the 1890s
Title	Director	Cast	Country	Subgenre/notes
1896
Le Manoir du diable	Georges Méliès	Georges Méliès, Jeanne d'Alcy	France	First Ever Horror Short film
Une nuit terrible	Georges Méliès	Georges Méliès	France	Short film
Escamotage d’une dame au théâtre Robert Houdin	Georges Méliès	Georges Méliès	France	Short film
1897
The Haunted Castle	George Albert Smith	George Albert Smith	United Kingdom	Short film
The Bewitched Inn	Georges Méliès	Georges Méliès	France	Short film
The X-Rays	George Albert Smith	Laura Bayley, Tom Green	United Kingdom	Short film
The Alchemist's Hallucination	Georges Méliès	Georges Méliès	France	Short film
1898
Photographing a Ghost	George Albert Smith	George Albert Smith	United Kingdom	Short film
The Accursed Cavern	Georges Méliès	Georges Méliès	France	Short film
The Astronomer's Dream	Georges Méliès	Georges Méliès	France	Short film
Shinin No Sosei (Resurrection of a Corpse)			Japan	Short film
Bake Jizo (Jizo the Spook)			Japan	Short film
The Cavalier's Dream	Albert E. Smith, J. Stuart Blackton	N/A	United States	Short film
1899
Cléopâtre	Georges Méliès	Georges Méliès, Jeanne d'Alcy	France	Short film
The Miser's Doom	Walter R. Booth	Walter R. Booth	United Kingdom	Short film
Le Diable au couvent	Georges Méliès	Georges Méliès	France	Short film
Raising Spirits	Georges Méliès	Georges Méliès	France	Short film

== See also ==
- Lists of horror films
