= 1897 in film =

The following is an overview of the events of 1897 in film, including a list of films released and notable births.

== Events ==
- January 1 - The first set of films was shown in the Philippines for the first time using 60 mm Gaumont Chrono-photograph projector at the Salon de Pertierra No. 12 Escolta, Manila. The first film shown was Espectaculo Scientifico and followed by other four movies, namely, Un Homme Au Chapeau (Man with a Hat), Une scène de danse japonnaise (Scene from a Japanese Dance), Les Boxers (The Boxers), and La Place de L' Opéra (The Place L' Opéra).
- January 28 – The first Venezuelan-made films are screened at the Baralt Theatre in Maracaibo, two locally made actuality shorts, Un célebre especialista sacando muelas en el gran Hotel Europa and Muchachos bañándose en la laguna de Maracaibo.
- May 4 – During a film screening at the Charity Bazaar in Paris, a curtain catches on fire from the ether used to fuel the projector lamp. The fire spreads and becomes catastrophic, ultimately resulting in 126 deaths.
- June 20 – Queen Victoria's Diamond Jubilee procession filmed.
- The American Vitagraph Company is founded by J. Stuart Blackton and Albert E. Smith in Brooklyn.
- Mitchell and Kenyon go into a film-making partnership at Blackburn in the north of England.
- Enoch J. Rector (1863-1957), develops a 63 mm film format called Veriscope, which The Veriscope Company of New York City films The Corbett-Fitzsimmons Fight in Carson City, Nevada, on St. Patrick's Day, (Irish holiday), March 17, film released in May
- Thomas Henry Blair develops a 48 mm film format called Viventoscope.

== Films released in 1897 ==
- After The Ball, directed by Georges Méliès. First film to create the illusion of female nudity through a skin looking designed costume
- Baignade dans le torrent, directed by Alice Guy-Blaché
- La Bandera Argentina, believed for a long time to have been the first Argentine film. Now considered lost
- Between Calais and Dover, directed by Georges Méliès. A fictitious sea crossing
- The Bewitched Inn (L'Auberge Ensorcelee), directed by Georges Méliès
- Buffalo Police on Parade, produced by Edison Studios
- The Cabinet of Mephistopheles (aka The Laboratory of Mephistopheles), directed by George Melies.
- Chicago Police Parade, directed by Louis Lumière
- The Corbett-Fitzsimmons Fight, a documentary directed by Enoch J. Rector. The first film shot in widescreen. At an hour and 40 minutes, it is the first known feature film ever made
- Cupid and Psyche, produced by Edison Studios
- An Hallucinated Alchemist, directed by Georges Méliès. May be the first film to feature stop motion animation in cinema
- Faust and Marguerite, directed by George Melies.
- The Haunted Castle, directed by George Albert Smith (film pioneer) (British)
- The Haverstraw Tunnel
- Horses Loading for Klondike, directed by James H. White
- The Hypnotist at Work, directed by Georges Méliès
- Kørsel med Grønlandske Hunde, directed by Peter Elfelt; the first Danish movie sequence ever filmed
- The Last Cartridges, directed by Georges Méliès. A dramatised war scene
- Leander Sisters, produced by Edison Studios
- Leaving Jerusalem by Railway, directed by Alexandre Promio and released by the Lumière brothers. May include the first moving camera shot in cinema
- Lurline Baths, produced by Edison Studios
- Making Sausages, directed by George Albert Smith
- The Milker's Mishap, directed by James H. White; it is unknown whether or not this film has survived
- New Pillow Fight, produced by Siegmund Lubin
- Niagara Falls, directed by Louis Lumière
- Old Man Drinking a Glass of Beer, directed by George Albert Smith
- On the Roofs, directed by Georges Méliès
- Peeping Tom, a production of the American Mutoscope Company. A comedy
- Prince Ranjitsinhji Practising Batting in the Nets, one of the earliest known films of Cricket
- Salida de la misa de doce de la Iglesia del Pilar de Zaragoza, a short silent film by Eduardo Jimeno, a pioneer of the Spanish cinema. Probably the first film made in Spain by a Spaniard
- Sea Fighting in Greece, directed by Georges Méliès. A dramatised naval war scene
- Seminary Girls, directed by James H. White
- Spanish Bullfight, directed by Louis Lumière
- The Surrender of Tournavos, directed by Georges Méliès. A dramatised war scene
- Sutro Baths, No. 1, produced by Edison Studios
- A Twentieth Century Surgeon, directed by George Melies
- The X-Rays, directed by George Albert Smith. Cited as one of the first examples of special effects by jump cut

== Births ==
Month	Date	Name	Country	Profession	Died
January	3	Marion Davies	US	Actress	1961
January	3	Pola Negri	Poland	Actress	1987
January	10	Lya De Putti	Hungary	Actress	1931
January	30	Mary Ellis	US	Singer, Actress	2003
February	10	Judith Anderson	Australia	Actress	1992
February	12	Vola Vale	US	Actress	1970
February	19	Alma Rubens	US	Actress	1931
March	8	Pat Flaherty	US	Actor	1970
March	16	Conrad Nagel	US	Actor	1970
March	19	Betty Compson	US	Actress	1974
May	18	Frank Capra	Italy	Director	1991
May	19	Kitty McShane	Ireland	Actress	1964
June	16	Elaine Hammerstein	US	Actress	1948
June	19	Moe Howard	US	Actor, Comedian	1975
June	23	Alexandru Giugaru	Romania	Actor	1986
July	10	John Gilbert	US	Actor	1936
August	4	Joseph Calleia	Malta	Actor, Singer	1975
August	10	Jack Haley	US	Actor, Dancer	1979
August	31	Fredric March	US	Actor	1975
September	3	Cecil Parker	UK	Actor	1971
September	23	Walter Pidgeon	US	Actor	1984
September	27	Gladys Henson	Ireland	Actress	1982
October	6	Jerome Cowan	US	Actor	1972
October	6	Francine Mussey	France	Actress	1933
October	11	Russell Collins	US	Actor	1965
October	12	Inez Courtney	US	Actress	1975
October	21	Lloyd Hughes	US	Actor	1958
October	28	Edith Head	US	Costume Designer	1981
29	Hope Emerson	US	Actress	1960
November	13	Gertrude Olmstead	US	Actress	1975
November	25	Ruth Etting	US	Actress, Singer	1978

== Debut ==
- Marshall P. Wilder
