= Haunted Castle =

Haunted Castle may refer to:

- The Haunted Castle (1896 film), a French film directed by Georges Méliès
- The Haunted Castle (1897 British film), a British film
- The Haunted Castle (1897 French film), a French film
- The Haunted Castle (1921 film), a German film directed by F. W. Murnau
- The Haunted Castle (1936 film), a German mystery film
- The Haunted Castle (1960 film) (Das Spukschloß im Spessart), a West German film
- Haunted Castle (2001 film), an IMAX movie
- Haunted Castle (video game), 1988 arcade game and part of the Castlevania series
- The Haunted Castle (book), published in 1979
- The Haunted Castle, a book in the Geronimo Stilton series
- Haunted Castle (Six Flags Great Adventure), amusement park attraction where eight teenagers died in a fire on May 11, 1984
- Haunted Castle (Efteling), 1978 attraction in the amusement park Efteling in the Netherlands
