= Spiders on a Web =

- Screencap from the film
- Directed by: George Albert Smith
- Release date: 1900
- Country: United Kingdom
- Language: Silent

Spiders on a Web is a 1900 British short silent documentary film, directed by George Albert Smith, featuring a single shot close-up of two spiders trapped in an enclosure (not on a web as indicated in the title). The film is, according to Michael Brooke of BFI Screenonline, "less formally ambitious" than the director's "groundbreaking multiple close-up study Grandma's Reading Glass (1900), made the same year, but is nonetheless, "one of the earliest British examples of close-up natural history photography, predating Percy Smith's insect studies by a decade."
