= The Old Maid's Valentine =

- Screencap from the film
- Directed by: George Albert Smith
- Starring: Laura Bayley
- Release date: September 1900
- Running time: 57 secs
- Country: United Kingdom
- Language: Silent

The Old Maid's Valentine

The Old Maid's Valentine is a 1900 British short silent comedy film, directed by George Albert Smith, which features the titular Miss Pimple receiving an unpleasant surprise on 14 February. The film, according to Michael Brooke of BFI Screenonline, "is essentially a facial – a medium close-up shot of a single performer whose changing expression constitutes virtually all the film's dramatic action." David Fisher points out that, "the flapping of the sheet of paper and the movement of the calendar betray the open-air set," which, "makes it difficult to read the message: Just like Mama," whilst, "the remarkably well-behaved cat," which, "sits patently licking its paws," "suggests that Smith may have already learned the trick of smearing the cat's fur with food."
