= Edmund Gurney =

British psychologist (1847–1888)

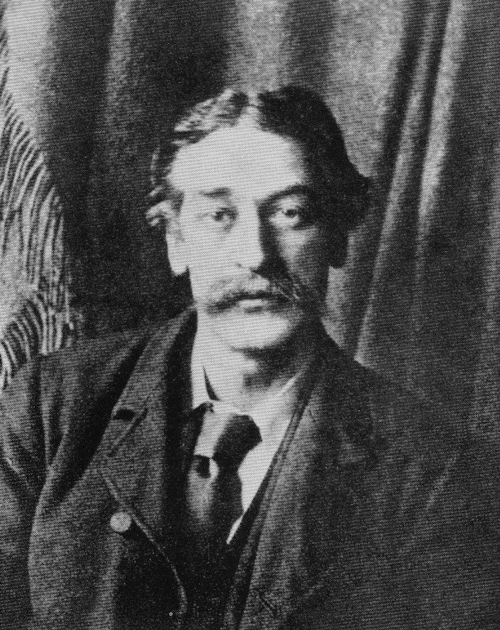
- Born: 23 March 1847; Hersham, England
- Died: 23 June 1888 (aged 41); Brighton, England
- Occupations: Psychologist, parapsychologist

Edmund Gurney (23 March 1847 – 23 June 1888) was an English psychologist and parapsychologist. At the time the term for research of paranormal activities was "psychical research".

== Early life ==
Gurney was born at Hersham, near Walton-on-Thames. He was educated at Blackheath and at Trinity College, Cambridge, from 1866, where he took fourth place in the classical tripos and obtained a fellowship in 1872. His work for the tripos was done, said his friend F. W. H. Myers, in the intervals of his practice on the piano. Dissatisfied with his own executive skill as a musician, he wrote The Power of Sound (1880), an essay on the philosophy of music.

He then studied medicine with no intention of practising, devoting himself to physics, chemistry and physiology. In 1880 he passed the second M.B. Cambridge (medical science). In 1881 he began the study of law at Lincoln's Inn.

In relation to psychical research, he asked whether there is an unexplored region of human faculty transcending the normal limitations of sensible knowledge. Gurney's purpose was to approach the subject by observation and experiment, especially in the hypnotism field. He wanted to investigate the persistence of the conscious human personality after the death of the body. Three of his sisters died when their barge overturned in the Nile River during a tour of Egypt in 1875, profoundly affecting him, and his research was partially fuelled by a desire to find some meaning to their deaths.

== Experimental work ==
Gurney began at what he later saw was the wrong end by studying, with Myers, the séances of professed spiritualistic mediums (1874–1878). Little but detection of imposture came of this. In 1882 the Society for Psychical Research was founded. Paid mediums were discarded, at least for the time, and experiments were made in thought-transference and hypnotism. Personal evidence as to uninduced hallucinations was also collected.

The first results are embodied in the volumes of Phantasms of the Living, a vast collection (Frank Podmore, Myers and Gurney), and in Gurney's essay, Hallucinations. Evidence for the process called telepathy was supposed to be established by the experiments chronicled in the Proceedings of the Society for Psychical Research, and it was argued that similar experiences occurred spontaneously, as, for example, in the many recorded instances of deathbed wraiths. The dying man was supposed to convey the hallucination of his presence as one living person experimentally conveys his thought to another, by thought-transference.

Gurney's hypnotic experiments were undertaken in the years 1885 to 1888. Their tendency was, in Myers's view, to prove that there is sometimes, in the induction of hypnotic phenomena, some agency at work which is neither ordinary nervous stimulation nor suggestion conveyed by any ordinary channel to the subject's mind. These results, if accepted, would corroborate the idea of telepathy. Experiments by Joseph Gibert, Paul Janet, Charles Richet, Méricourt and others were cited as tending in the same direction.

Other experiments dealt with the relation of the memory in the hypnotic state to the memory in another hypnotic state, and of both to the normal memory. Gurney's research into psychic matters was respected by contemporaries. However, it has since then been argued to be deeply flawed: Gurney trusted in the assistance of one George Albert Smith, a theatrical performer and producer. Smith was the one handling the actual experiments into telepathy, hypnotism, and the rest, and Gurney fully accepted his results. According to Trevor H. Hall in his study The Strange Case of Edmund Gurney, in the spring of 1888 Gurney discovered that Smith had used his knowledge of theatrical trickery and stage illusion to fake tests and results; so that the value of the tests (with which Gurney was building up his reputation) were worthless. Douglas Blackburn, Smith's principal partner in the mentalist performances and experiments, publicly admitted fraud in 1908 and again in 1911, although Smith denied it.

== Death ==
He died at Brighton on 23 June 1888, from the effects of an overdose of chloroform. At the inquest, Arthur Thomas Myers, the brother of F.W.H. Myers, testified to having prescribed chloroform for neuralgia, and a verdict of accidental death was recorded. It was widely thought at the time that Gurney might have committed suicide, and Alice James recorded this in her diary.

Trevor Hall has argued the case that Gurney's death was suicide, resulting from disillusionment after discovering the frauds of Blackburn and Smith. Gordon Epperson argues against this hypothesis and Janet Oppenheim concludes that "the mystery is not likely to be resolved".

Following the death of Gurney, William James, in a letter to George Croom Robertson dated Aug 1888, made a heartfelt tribute to Gurney: "Poor Edmund Gurney! How I shall miss that man's presence in the world. I think, to compare small things with great, that there was a very unusual sort of affinity between my mind and his. Our problems were the same, and for the most part our solutions. I eagerly devoured every word he wrote, and was always conscious of him as critic and judge. He had both quantity and quality, and I hoped for some big philosophic achievement from him ere he should get through. And now — omnia ademit una dies infesta — The world is grown hollower."

== Works ==
In addition to his work on music and his psychological writings, he was the author of Tertium Quid (1887), a collection of essays, the title a protest against one-sided ideas and methods of discussion.

== Personal life ==
In 1877 Gurney married Kate Sara Sibley. They had one daughter, Helen, born in 1881. After Gurney's death, Kate married Archibald Grove, a journalist and politician, in 1889.

== See also ==
- Palm Sunday Case

== Sources ==
- Epperson, Gordon (1997). The Mind of Edmund Gurney. Fairleigh Dickinson University Press. ISBN 0-8386-3720-5.
- Hall, Trevor H. (1964). The Strange Case of Edmund Gurney. London: Gerald Duckworth & Company.
- Oppenheim, Janet (1988). The Other World: Spiritualism and Psychical Research in England, 1850–1914. Cambridge University Press. ISBN 0-521-34767-X.

Attribution:
