= Grandma Threading her Needle =

- Screenshot from the film
- Directed by: George Albert Smith
- Produced by: George Albert Smith
- Starring: Eva Bayley
- Cinematography: George Albert Smith
- Production company: G.A. Smith
- Release date: September 1900
- Running time: 56 secs
- Country: United Kingdom
- Language: Silent

Grandma Threading her Needle is a 1900 British short silent comedy film, directed by George Albert Smith, featuring an old woman trying to get a thread though a needle. The sole purpose of the 56-second single-shot film, like the director's earlier Old Man Drinking a Glass of Beer (1898), according to Michael Brooke of BFI Screenonline, "is to record changing facial expressions for the purposes of entertainment."
