= Dream sequence =

Storytelling technique

A dream sequence is a technique used in storytelling, particularly in television and film, to set apart a brief interlude from the main story. The interlude may consist of a flashback, a flashforward, a fantasy, a vision, a dream, or some other element.

== Purposes ==
Commonly, dream sequences appear in many films to shed light on the psychical process of the dreaming character or give the audience a glimpse into the character's past. For instance, in Pee-wee's Big Adventure, the purpose of Pee-wee's dreams is to inform the audience of his anxieties and fears after losing his bike. Other times major action takes place in dreams, allowing the filmmaker to explore infinite possibilities, as Michel Gondry demonstrates in The Science of Sleep. Harvard psychologist Deirdre Barrett points out in the book The Committee of Sleep that, while the main content of dream sequences is determined by the film's overall plot, visual details often reflect the individual dream experience of the screenwriter or director. For Alfred Hitchcock's Spellbound, Salvador Dalí designed sharply angled sets inspired by his own dream space. Ingmar Bergman lit dream sequences in several films with a harsh glare of light which he says reflects his own nightmares (though most peoples have dim light), and Orson Welles designed a scene of The Trial to reflect the manner in which architecture constantly changed in his dreams.

Films normally present dreams as a visually accessible or objectively observed space, a discrete environment in which characters exist and interact as they do in the world rather than restricting themselves to the subjective point of view a dream is normally experienced from in real life. In this way films succeed in presenting a coherent dreamed world alongside the diegetic reality of the film. Via transition from one to the next, a film establishes not only the boundaries but resonances between the two worlds. These resonances can reveal a character's subjective observations or desires without breaking away from the objective viewpoint of the narrator, camera, or director with which some theorists, such as Christian Metz, believe the viewer identifies.

It is also possible to retroactively explain past plot elements as a dream sequence in order to maintain a plausible continuity in continuing fiction, such as a television series. Such was the case with Dallas, which had killed off Bobby Ewing, one of the more popular characters on the show; when the show's writers decided to bring Bobby back to the show, the tenth-season premiere "Return to Camelot" revealed that the events between Bobby's death and the end of season nine were all part of a nightmare his wife was having.

== Techniques ==
Audio or visual elements, such as distinctive music or coloration, are frequently used to signify the beginning and end of a dream sequence in film. It has also become commonplace to distinguish a dream sequence from the rest of the film by showing a shot of a person in bed sleeping or about to go to sleep. Other films show a dream sequence followed by a character waking up in their own bed, such as the dream sequence George Gershwin composed for his film score to Delicious. In classic Hollywood, the wavy dissolve was the standard way to transition between reality and a dream; there would be a close-up of the character having the dream, which would begin shimmering as we crossed over from reality to fantasy. One of the most common contemporary transitions into a fantasy is to zoom in on a character's face and then spin around to the back of that character to reveal that he/she is now standing in an alternate reality. Perhaps the most common technique today is the post-reveal in which a character is shown in an awkward or unusual situation, the scene builds to an even more absurd or unusual situation, and then suddenly there is a cut to the character waking up, as exemplified by the opening sequence of Bring It On where a pep rally with irreverent routines builds into an abnormal moment where a character is revealed topless; she then wakes up to the viewers' realization that she had been dreaming.

This is akin to the technique wherein a dream sequence is a plot device in which an entire story has been revealed to be a dream. As opposed to a segment of an otherwise real scenario, in these cases it is revealed that everything depicted was unreal. Often this is used to explain away otherwise inexplicable events. Because it has been done in many occasions to resolve a storyline that seemed out of place or unexpected, it is often considered weak storytelling; a particularly referenced example of this is the TV show Dallas in which the entirety of season 9 was revealed in fact to have been a dream. Furthermore, in-jokes are often made in writing (particularly television scripts) that refer to the disappointment a viewer might feel in finding out everything they have watched was a dream. For example, entire sequences of the Family Guy two-part episode "Stewie Kills Lois" and "Lois Kills Stewie" are revealed to have taken place within a virtual reality simulation, upon which a character asks whether a potential viewer could be angry that they have effectively watched a dream sequence, but this technique can also be effective and its use lauded when the status of dream or reality is left more ambiguous as it was in The Wizard of Oz.

The camera angles and movements used to depict dream sequences enable this kind of play and confusion between the diegetic reality and the dreamed world by presenting the dream world as a visually accessible space in which the character moves around the same as he does in the diegetic reality, as opposed to restricting themselves cinematographically to a subjective viewpoint even though dreams are generally understood to be experienced by the dreamer from their own subjective point of view. This point is made salient by the films which choose to employ first-person camera angles such as Strange Days (1995) when it depicts recorded memories experienced via the "SQUID" recorder, the first-person sequence of Doom (2005), the beginning of Enter the Void (2010), and others, and how radically these moments stand out against normal cinematography even when the subject matter is something as subjective as a dream. Many have cited the general impracticality and unattractiveness of sustained first-person perspective in film as a reason for its absence from filmed dream sequences.

== History ==
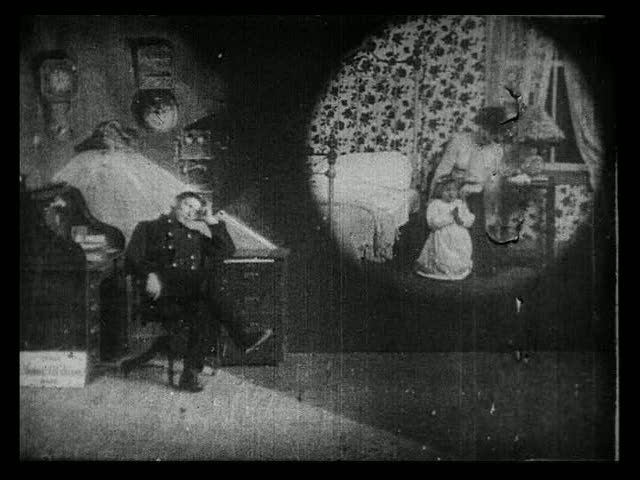
A dream sequence in Life of an American Fireman (1903)

The dream sequence that Atossa narrates near the beginning of Aeschylus' Athenian tragedy The Persians (472 BC) may be the first in the history of European theater. The first dream sequence in a film is more contested. Film critic Bob Mondello claims that the first famous movie with a dream sequence was Buster Keaton's Sherlock Jr. (1924). Predating this, Leslie Halpern claims the earliest dream sequence was in Edwin S. Porter's Life of an American Fireman (1903). Earlier than either of these, James Walters points out G. A. Smith's use of a dream sequence in Let Me Dream Again (1900), but is careful to note the precariousness of claiming any film the first to feature a dream sequence given the rapid transnational development of cinema in its early years and that so many films from the period have been lost.

Walters traces the dream sequence technique of revealing one thing to be another (revealing what the audience thought was a dream to actually be reality), back to magic lantern shows features "slipping" or "slipper" slides in which some lantern slides, for examples, would feature two sheets of glass with different images painted on each, say a cocoon and a butterfly. The first sheet would be projected and then the second sheet slid on top of it to reveal a change, such as a butterfly emerging from a cocoon. Dream sequences became very popular in the early period of film following this change of phase format. Alongside this technique, a dream sequence which is introduced by a character falling asleep and then entering the dream sequence also became popular via such films as Edwin S. Porter's Dream of a Rarebit Fiend (1906). What is important to note is these films created a model for dream sequences in which a character's inner thoughts are not represented subjectively (from the character's point of view), but from an objective camera angle that gives the audience the impression less of a character having a dream than of being transported alongside the character into a dreamed world in which the character's actions are captured by the camera in the same way they are the films' real fictional worlds.
