= Dream and Reality =

1904 French silent short film

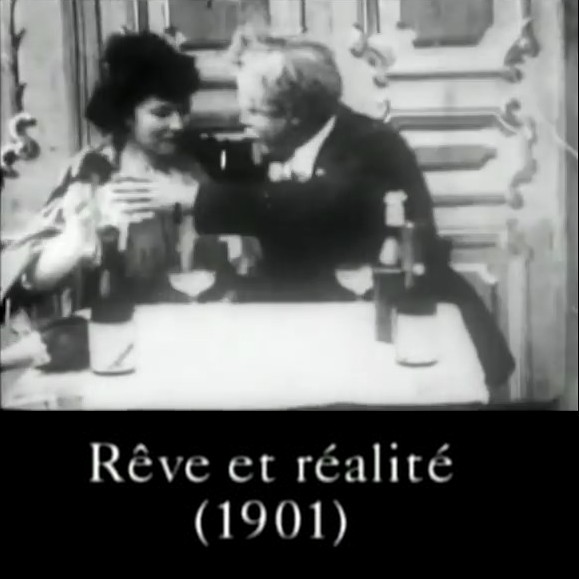
- French: Rêve et Réalité
- Directed by: Ferdinand Zecca
- Cinematography: Ferdinand Zecca
- Production company: Pathé Frères
- Distributed by: Pathé Company
- Release date: 1901
- Running time: 1 minute
- Country: France

Dream and Reality (French: Rêve et réalité) is a 1901 French silent short film directed by Ferdinand Zecca and distributed in France by Pathé Frères. The film depicts a man flirting with a pretty young woman suddenly waking up in bed next to his ugly wife.

== Plot ==
A well-dressed man pours a glass of champagne for a young woman who is sitting with him at a dining table. She is costumed, wearing a mask and cape. He removes the mask and cape, revealing a smiling beauty. He takes her in his arms to kiss her; she cooperates. This view is suddenly replaced by one of an old couple in bed, him kissing her, she enthusiastically willing. Only the woman is the man's wife and not as pretty of his recent dream. The man is not happy to be back in reality.

== Production and Distribution ==
The film was shot on 9 July 1901. It was distributed in France and Brazil, as well as in the United States and Russia.

== Analysis ==
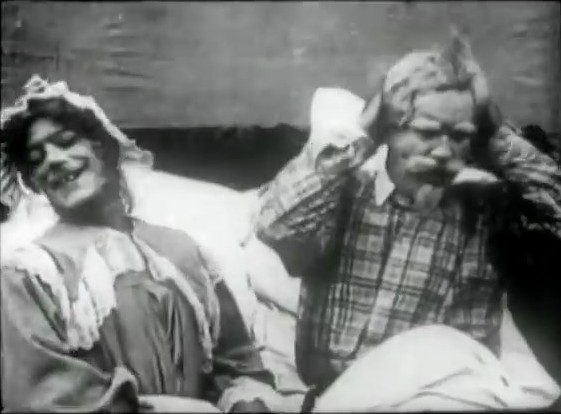
Screenshot

The film is a remake George Albert Smith's 1900 film Let Me Dream Again Both films are composed of two shots, the first one showing the dream and the second the reality. However, an important difference is the technique used to show the transition from dream to reality. Smith used focus pulling to let the first shot slip out of focus before cutting to the second shot, which starts off out of focus and gradually sharpens. Zecca on the other hand seems to have been the first director to use a dissolve to show a smooth transition between dream and reality.
