= Woman Draped in Patterned Handkerchiefs =

- Screencap from the film
- Directed by: George Albert Smith
- Release date: 1908
- Running time: 45 seconds
- Country: United Kingdom
- Language: Silent

Woman Draped in Patterned Handkerchiefs (second part)

Woman Draped in Patterned Handkerchiefs is a 1908 British short silent documentary film, directed by George Albert Smith as a showcase of his new Kinemacolor system, which features a woman displaying assorted tartan cloths, both draped on her body and waved semaphore-style. The patterned handkerchiefs are, according to Michael Brooke of BFI Screenonline, "presumably the same cloths featured in Tartans of Scottish Clans (1906), this time shown from various angles."
