= The Death of Poor Joe =

1901 British film by George Albert

- Full film
- Directed by: George Albert Smith
- Starring: Laura Bayley; Tom Green
- Distributed by: Warwick Trading Company
- Release date: March 1901
- Running time: One minute
- Country: United Kingdom
- Language: Silent

The Death of Poor Joe is a 1901 British short silent drama film, directed by George Albert Smith, which features the director's wife Laura Bayley as Joe, a child street-sweeper who dies of disease on the street in the arms of a policeman. The film, which went on release in March 1901, takes its name from a famous photograph posed by Oscar Rejlander after an episode in Charles Dickens' 1853 novel Bleak House, and is the oldest known surviving film featuring a Dickens character.

The film was discovered in 2012 by British Film Institute curator Bryony Dixon, after it was believed to have been lost since 1954. Until the discovery, the previous oldest known Dickens film was Scrooge, or, Marley's Ghost, released in November 1901.

== Cast ==
- Laura Bayley as Joe
- Tom Green as the policeman

== See also ==
- List of rediscovered films
