= The Sick Kitten =

1903 film by George Albert Smith

- Screenshot from the film
- Directed by: George Albert Smith
- Produced by: George Albert Smith
- Cinematography: George Albert Smith
- Production company: G.A. Smith
- Distributed by: Warwick Trading Company
- Release date: February 1903
- Running time: 34 secs
- Country: United Kingdom
- Language: Silent

The Sick Kitten

The Sick Kitten is a 1903 British short silent comedy film, directed by George Albert Smith, featuring two young children tending to a sick kitten.

== Significance ==
A remake of the director's now-lost The Little Doctor (1901), The Sick Kitten, according to Michael Brooke of BFI Screenonline, "continues the editing technique that he first explored in Grandma's Reading Glass (1900) and As Seen Through a Telescope (1900)," but, "without the circular black mask to differentiate it," as presumably, "Smith believed that his audience would have grown more sophisticated and would be able to tell the difference between a medium shot and close-up without prompting."
