= Trevor H. Hall =

British author, surveyor and sceptic of paranormal phenomena

Trevor Henry Hall
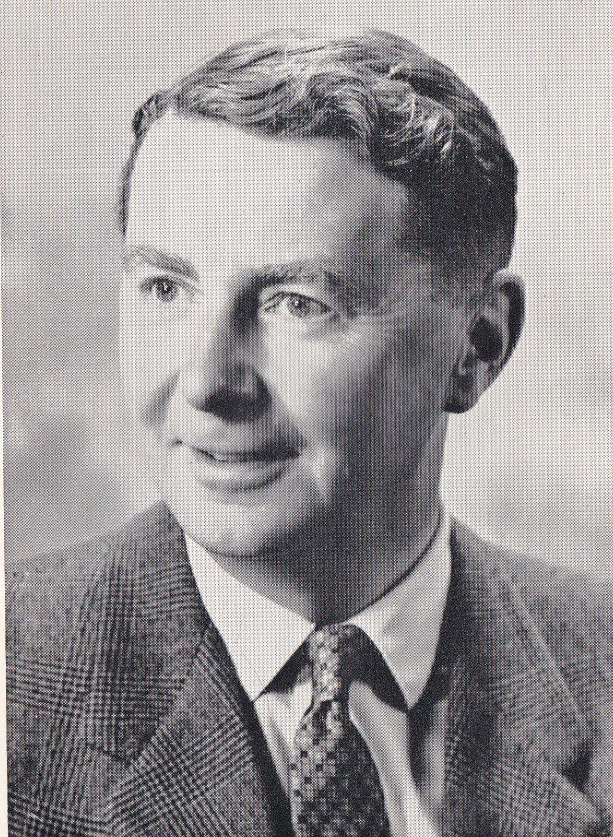
- Trevor. H. Hall in 1963
- Born: Trevor Henry Hall; May 28, 1910; Wakefield, West Yorkshire, England
- Died: March 8, 1991 (aged 80); Selby, Yorkshire, England
- Occupations: Amateur magician; sceptic; author

Trevor Henry Hall (May 28, 1910 – March 8, 1991) was a British author, surveyor, and sceptic of paranormal phenomena. Hall made controversial claims regarding early members of the Society for Psychical Research. His books caused a heated controversy within the parapsychology community.

== Career ==
Hall was born in Wakefield, England. He served as a major in the British army during World War II (1939–45) and became a senior partner of V. Walker and Son (chartered surveyors) (1945–80). He was the vice president of the Huddersfield Building Society (1958–80).

He had a deep interest in magic and mystery. Hall was a student in psychical research at Trinity College, Cambridge (1954–56). His knowledge of conjuring and magic helped him discover the tricks of mediums, many of whom had been caught in fraud. Hall was an ex-member and critic of the Society for Psychical Research and published a series of sceptical books on the paranormal and psychical research. He was a collector of magic books and was a member of The Magic Circle. He also wrote three books on the higher criticism of Sherlock Holmes.

== Research ==
=== Florence Cook ===
In his controversial book The Spiritualists (1962), Hall stated that the famous medium Florence Cook was a fraud who had an affair with the chemist and psychical researcher William Crookes.

Hall drew upon Francis G. H. Anderson's statements to the Society for Psychical Research in 1922 and 1941. Anderson claimed to have had an affair with Cook himself; he also stated that she was a sexual maniac who confessed to having an affair with Crookes. In 1964, psychical researchers R. G. Medhurst and K. M. Goldney cast considerable doubt on the reliability of Anderson's testimony and dismissed Hall's allegations. Biographer William Hodson Brock who has praised Hall's book also doubted the claims of an affair.

Regarding Hall's research that Cook had an affair with Crookes, historian Asa Briggs in a review commented that "the verdict does not seem to be fully proven, although the evidence is striking".

Psychologist Ray Hyman has noted that despite how one may consider the allegations, "there is no question that Hall has unearthed much material that throws strong suspicions on Crookes's handling of this investigation." Researchers such as Ruth Brandon and Eric Dingwall have supported Hall's arguments against Cook and Crookes.

=== Edmund Gurney ===
In his book The Strange Case of Edmund Gurney (1964), Hall made the claim that Edmund Gurney committed suicide after discovering the frauds of Douglas Blackburn and George Albert Smith. This has been strongly contested by biographer Trevor Hamilton and the psychical researcher Alan Gauld.

Parapsychologist Fraser Nicol published an extremely negative review of Hall's book on Gurney. This caused a threat of a libel action from Hall.

=== Daniel Dunglas Home ===
In his book The Enigma of Daniel Home: Medium or Fraud? (1984), Hall asserted that the medium Daniel Dunglas Home had invented his aristocratic background.

Hall's research led him to conclude that the alleged levitation of Home at Ashley House never happened as the eyewitness reports contradicted each other and all Home did was step across a gap of four feet between two iron balconies.

== Reception ==
Researcher Georgess McHargue noted that Hall was "one of the most astute of modern investigators, combining twentieth-century scientific techniques with a cheerful and readable writing style in his many books." However, Roger Luckhurst has written that Hall's "books proceed with a combination of careful archival work and abusive character assassinations."

In the book A Skeptic's Handbook of Parapsychology (1985), authors Gerd H. Hövelmann, Marcello Truzzi and Piet Hein Hoebens noted that "[al]though Hall's historical detective work is often impressive, his conclusions sometimes go beyond his data. Despite the flaws in some of Hall's efforts, his writings should be required reading for everyone interested in early psychical research."

== Publications ==
- The Haunting of Borley Rectory: A Critical Survey of the Evidence [with Eric Dingwall, K. M. Goldney] (1956)
- Four Modern Ghosts [with Eric Dingwall] (1958)
- The Spiritualists: The Story of Florence Cook and William Crookes (1962), published in America in 1963.
- Florence Cook and William Crookes: A Footnote to an Enquiry (1963)
- The Strange Case of Edmund Gurney (1964)
- New Light on Old Ghosts (1965)
- Strange Things [with John Lorne Campbell] (1968)
- Sherlock Holmes: Ten Literary Studies (1969)
- The Late Mr Sherlock Holmes: and Other Literary Studies (1971)
- Old Conjuring Books (1973)
- The Early Years of the Huddersfield Building Society (1974)
- Sherlock Holmes and His Creator (1977)
- Search for Harry Price (1980)
- The Enigma of Daniel Home: Medium or Fraud? (1984)
- The Medium and the Scientist: The Story of Florence Cook and William Crookes (1985)
