= Let Me Dream Again =

- Screenshot from the film
- Directed by: George Albert Smith
- Produced by: George Albert Smith
- Starring: Tom Green; Laura Bayley
- Cinematography: George Albert Smith
- Production company: G.A. Smith
- Distributed by: Warwick Trading Company
- Release date: August 1900
- Running time: 1 minute 16 secs
- Country: United Kingdom
- Language: Silent

Let Me Dream Again

Let Me Dream Again is a 1900 British short silent drama film, directed by George Albert Smith, featuring a man dreaming about an attractive young woman and then waking up next to his wife. The film stars Smith's real wife, Laura Bayley, as the woman of his fantasies. Bayley would later appear in Smith's 1903 film Mary Jane's Mishap. The film, according to Michael Brooke of BFI Screenonline, "is an excellent example of an early two-shot film, and is particularly interesting for the way it attempts a primitive dissolve by letting the first shot slip out of focus before cutting to the second shot, which starts off out of focus and gradually sharpens." This appears to be the first use of a dissolve transition to signify a movement of a dreaming state to one of reality.

Of further interest is the camera composition of the husband and wife in bed. The bed is placed upright against a wall and in front of a camera that is fixed to the floor, giving the appearance of two people lying in bed, when in reality they are standing. The film was shot in Smith's own studio, the former pump house at St Ann's Well Gardens in Hove. The film was remade by Ferdinand Zecca for Pathé as Dream and Reality (1901).
