= Hanging Out the Clothes =

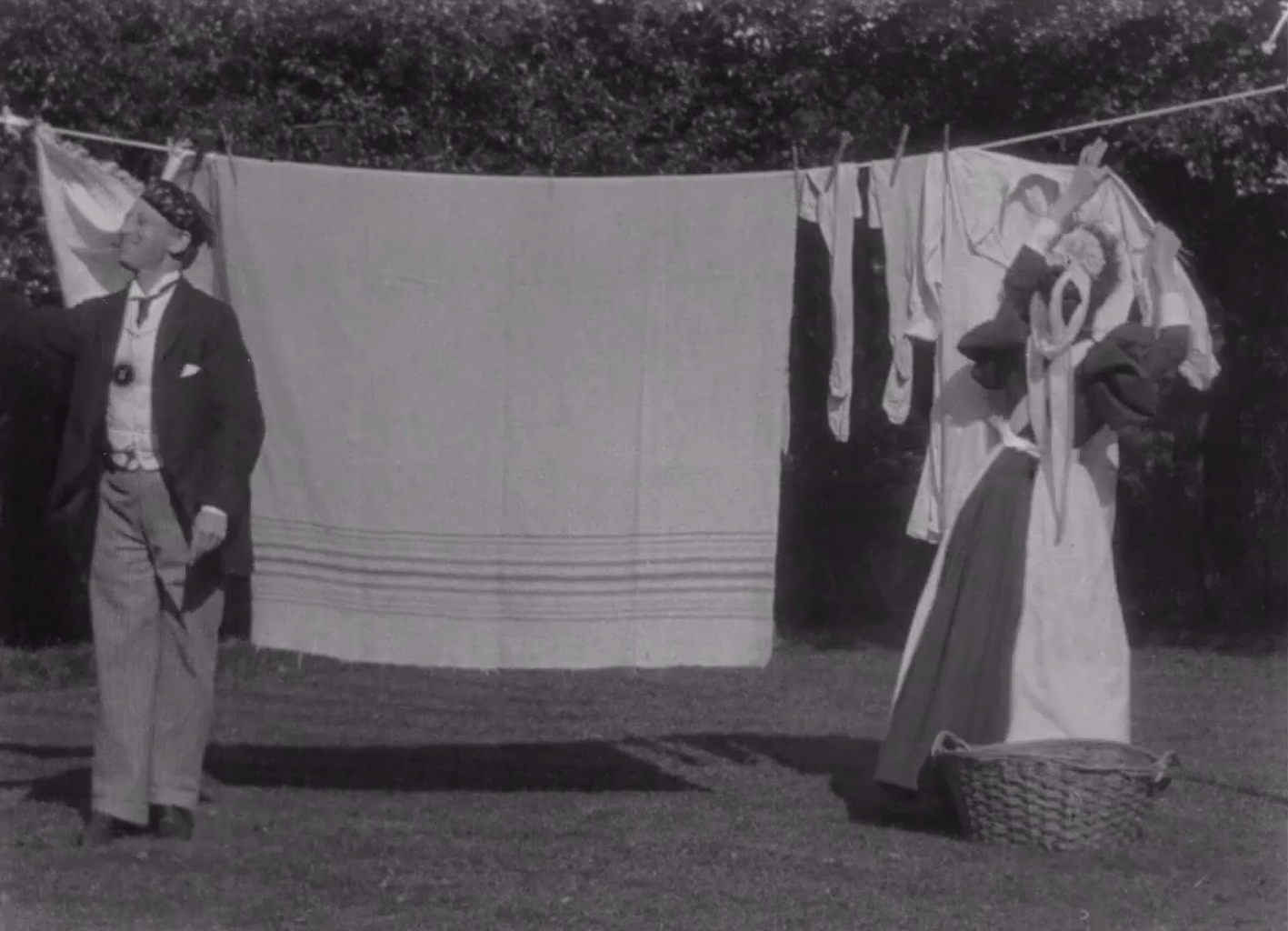
- Directed by: George Albert Smith
- Produced by: George Albert Smith
- Release date: 1897
- Running time: 1 minute 30 seconds
- Country: United Kingdom
- Language: silent

Hanging Out the Clothes is a black and white silent short comedy film shot in 1897 by British filmmaker George Albert Smith. Filmed at St Ann's Well and Garden in Brighton, the short piece shows a couple messing around whilst hanging their clothes up.

== Synopsis ==
In the 1 minute 30 second long film it shows a couple played by Tom Green and Laura Bayley start having some fun behind the clothes that had been hung up pre shot until a woman presumably Tom Green's wife walks into frame and interrupts the couple in a comical way and starts disciplining the husband for messing around.

== Cast ==
- Laura Bayley as maid
- Tom Green as a mischievous husband
