= 1900 in film =

The year 1900 in film involved some significant events.

== Events ==
- Reulos, Goudeau & Co. invent Mirographe, a 21 mm amateur format.
- The Lumière Brothers premiere their new Lumiere Wide format for the 1900 World Fair. At 75 mm wide, it has held the record for over 100 years as the widest format yet developed.
- Raoul Grimoin-Sanson also creates a sensation at the 1900 World Fair with his multi-projector Cinéorama spectacle, which uses ten 70 mm projectors to create a simulated 360-degree balloon ride over Paris. The exhibit is closed before it formally opens, however, due to legitimate health and safety concerns regarding the heat of the combined projectors, and releases the format as La Petite.
- Gaumont-Demeny release their own 15 mm amateur format, Pocket Chrono.
- Release of the first film version of Hamlet, an adaptation of the duel scene, with French actress Sarah Bernhardt playing the title role and accompanying recorded sound.
- Making of the first film to feature the detective character Sherlock Holmes, Sherlock Holmes Baffled, by the American Mutoscope and Biograph Company.
- Jeanne d'Arc becomes the first film of considerable length (10 minutes) to be shown entirely in colour.
- William N. Selig makes The Chicago Stockyards—From Hoof to Market for Chicago-based Philip Danforth Armour, a prominent businessman in the meatpacking industry, showing the full meatpacking process from cattle being unloaded at the stockyards to canning. Studio lights do not exist, so stage spotlights are borrowed from the Richard Mansfield Theatrical Company to film inside the slaughterhouse.

== Notable films ==
=== # ===
- 20,000 Employees Entering Lord Armstrong's Elswick Works, Newcastle upon Tyne, produced by Mitchell and Kenyon – (UK)

=== A ===
- Army Life; or, How Soldiers Are Made: Mounted Infantry (lost), a documentary directed by Robert W. Paul – (UK)
- As Seen Through a Telescope, directed by George Albert Smith – (UK)
- Attack on a China Mission, directed by James Williamson – (UK)
- Automobile Parade, directed by William C. Paley – (US)

=== B ===
- Battle of Mafeking, directed by James H. White – (US)
- The Beggar's Deceit, directed by Cecil Hepworth – (UK)

=== C ===
- Chinese Magic (aka Yellow Peril), directed by Walter R. Booth – (UK)
- The Clown and the Alchemist, directed by J. Stuart Blackton and Albert E. Smith – (US)

=== D ===
- Danse Serpentine (In a Lion's Cage), directed by Alice Guy – (France)
- Davy Jones' Locker, directed by Frederick S. Armitage – (US)

=== E ===
The Enchanted Drawing

- The Enchanted Drawing, directed by J. Stuart Blackton – (US)
- Explosion of a Motor Car, directed by Cecil Hepworth – (UK)

=== F ===
- A Fantastical Meal (Le Repas fantastique), directed by Georges Méliès – (France)
- Faust and Marguerite, directed by Edwin S. Porter, based on the 1859 opera by Charles Gounod – (US)

=== G ===
- Going to Bed Under Difficulties (Le Déshabillage impossible), directed by Georges Méliès – (France)
- Grandma's Reading Glass, directed by George Albert Smith – (UK)

=== H ===
- How He Missed His Train (Le Réveil d'un monsieur pressé), directed by Georges Méliès – (France)
- How It Feels to Be Run Over, directed by Cecil Hepworth – (UK)

=== J ===
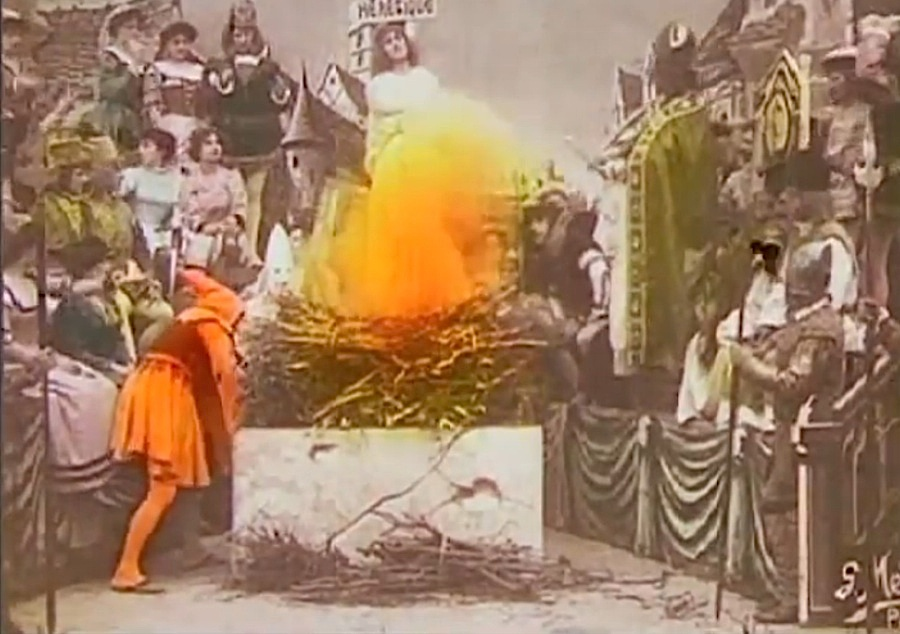
Joan burning at the stake at the climax of Joan of Arc

- A Jersey Skeeter, directed by Arthur Marvin – (US)
- Joan of Arc (Jeanne d'Arc), directed by Georges Méliès – (France)

=== K ===
- The Kiss, directed by Edwin S. Porter – (US)

=== L ===
- Ladies' Skirt Nailed to a Fence, produced by Bamforth & Co Ltd – (UK)
- Let Me Dream Again, directed by George Albert Smith – (UK)

=== M ===
- Messrs Lumb And Co., Leaving the Works, Huddersfield, produced by Mitchell and Kenyon – (UK)
- Eine moderne Jungfrau von Orléans, directed by Max Skladanowsky – (Germany)
- The Mystic Swing, directed by Edwin S. Porter – (US)

=== O ===
- The One-Man Band (L'Homme-Orchestre), directed by Georges Méliès – (France)

=== R ===
- Reproduction of the McGovern and Dixon Fight, starring Terry McGovern and George Dixon – (US)
- Rough Sea, produced by Bamforth & Co Ltd. – (UK)

=== S ===
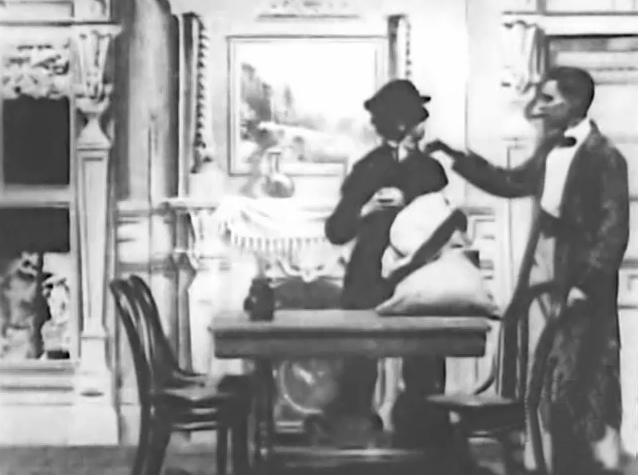
Sherlock Holmes Baffled

- Sherlock Holmes Baffled, directed by Arthur Marvin – (US)
- Soldiers of the Cross (lost), directed by Joseph Perry – (Australia)
- Solser en Hesse (lost), directed by M.H. Laddé – (Netherlands)

=== T ===
- The Two Blind Men (Les Deux Aveugles) (lost), directed by Georges Méliès – (France)

=== U ===
- Uncle Josh in a Spooky Hotel, directed by Edwin S. Porter – (US)
- Uncle Josh's Nightmare, directed by Edwin S. Porter – (US)

=== V ===
- Le village de Namo – Panorama pris d'une chaise à porteurs, directed by Gabriel Veyre – (France)

== Births ==
Month	Date	Name	Country	Profession	Died
January	10	Jean Gehret	Switzerland	Actor, director	1956
January	20	Colin Clive	UK	Actor	1937
February
February	13	Barbara von Annenkoff	Germany	Actress	1979
February	16	Vincent Coleman	US	Actor	1971
February	16	Albert Hackett	US	Actor, screenwriter	1995
February	17	Ruth Clifford	US	Actress	1998
February	21	Jeanne Aubert	France	Singer, actress	1988
February	22	Luis Buñuel	Spain	Screenwriter, director	1983
February	26	Jean Negulesco	Romania	Screenwriter, director	1993
March	3	Edna Best	UK	Actress	1974
April	5	Spencer Tracy	US	Actor	1967
April	9	Paul Willis	US	Actor	1960
April	30	David Manners	Canada	Actor	1998
May	9	Maria Malicka	Poland	Actress	1992
May	16	Aage Winther-Jørgensen	Denmark	Actor	1967
July	10	Evelyn Laye	UK	Actress	1996
July	27	Charles Vidor	Hungary	Director	1959
August
August	8	Alexis Minotis	Greece	Actor and director	1990
August	8	Robert Siodmak	Germany	Director	1976
August	9	Charles Farrell	US	Actor	1990
August	11	Monroe Owsley	US	Actor	1937
August	23	Eve Southern	US	Actress	1972
August	24	Preston Foster	US	Actor, singer	1970
September	19	Ricardo Cortez	US	Actor, director	1977
October	9	Alastair Sim	Scotland	Actor	1976
October	10	Helen Hayes	US	Actress	1993
October	15	Fritz Feld	Germany	Actor	1993
October	15	Mervyn LeRoy	US	Director, producer, screenwriter	1987
October	17	Jean Arthur	US	Actress	1991
November	5	Natalie Schafer	US	Actress	1991
December	6	Agnes Moorehead	US	Actress	1974
December	17	Katina Paxinou	Greece	Actress	1973

=== Date unknown ===
Juanita Angeles, Filipina pre-war and silent film actress

== Deaths ==
- November 22 – Arthur Sullivan, producer of musicals, half of the team of Gilbert and Sullivan (born 1842)
- November 30 – Oscar Wilde, playwright whose works were made into films (born 1854)
- December 31 – Hannibal Goodwin, retired minister, in 1886 invented nitrate film roll. (born 1822)

== Debut ==
- Sarah Bernhardt
- Benoit Constant Coquelin
