= The House of the Devil =

The House of the Devil may refer to:

- The House of the Devil (1896 film)
- The House of the Devil (2009 film)
