= The Miller and the Sweep =

1897 film by George Albert Smith

- Screenshot from the film
- Directed by: George Albert Smith
- Produced by: George Albert Smith
- Cinematography: George Albert Smith
- Production company: G.A. Smith
- Distributed by: Warwick Trading Company
- Release date: 1897
- Running time: 49 secs
- Country: United Kingdom
- Language: Silent

The Miller and the Sweep

The Miller and the Sweep is an 1897 British short black-and-white silent comedy film, directed by George Albert Smith, featuring a miller carrying a bag of flour fighting with a chimney sweep carrying a bag of soot in front of a windmill, before a crowd comes and chases them away. The film, according to Michael Brooke of BFI Screenonline, "was one of the first films made by G.A. Smith, shortly after he first acquired a camera," and is also, "one of the earliest films to show a clear awareness of its visual impact when projected."

== Plot ==
A miller is carrying a sack of flour from his windmill, when he accidentally bumps into a chimney sweep who is carrying a sack of soot. The two start fighting, during the course of which the miller is covered with soot and the chimney sweep is covered with flour. The chimney sweep chases the miller off screen, and a small crowd of adults and children appears unexpectedly from the right of the screen to chase after them both. The film finishes when the last of the crowd exits the shot.

== Production and release ==
The Miller and the Sweep was one of Smith's earliest productions, having built his first film camera the previous year. It was filmed in a single shot on 24 July 1897 in front of Race Hill Mill on the South Downs, north of Brighton Racecourse, and then re-filmed on 24 September - it is probably this latter version that has survived. These two versions are mentioned in Smith's cash book. There is no mention of the first print from July being sold. It is likely that the film was rehearsed before filming, as this was Smith's usual way of working with fiction films. The names of the actors are unknown, as with many films from the period, and it is not clear whether they are professional actors, music hall performers, comedians, or simply amateurs.

The September version of the film was available for commercial sale within a fortnight of its filming, and two prints were sold in the first week of October.

== Analysis ==
The Miller and the Sweep makes use of a music hall motif that was prominent from the 1880s, that of "encounters between black and white", as represented by a miller or whitewasher and a sweep, or similar. The same theme can be seen in Smith's 1898 film The Baker and the Sweep, and in other film-makers' works, such as James Williamson's Washing the Sweep (1899) or Robert W. Paul's Whitewash and Miller (1898). Often, "black" and "white" would be in competition with one another for the affection of a woman, although Smith avoided this romantic element in his film. For example, a popular comic sketch in England in the 1880s was "The Sweep and the Miller", performed by Professor Daltrey and Corporal Higgins. In this, the two suitors attempt to woo a housemaid, prompting a fight between them. More generally, comedic violence between working-class stereotypes was also a feature of Victorian music hall productions, which would become important in early film comedy.

The film also provides an early example of an on-screen chase, of the type that would become particularly popular from 1903 onwards, in a trend prompted by British productions such as A Daring Daylight Burglary and Desperate Poaching Affray. Film historian Stephen Bottomore has stated that with this work, "Smith helped invent the chase film", by offering a "model for the chases in numerous British and other films in the years that followed".

== Current status ==
The film has survived in its entirety, and the British Film Institute has made it available for viewing on its Screenonline website. A clip from this film is featured in Paul Merton's interactive guide to early British silent comedy How They Laughed. The film has been included on at least two modern DVD collections: Early Cinema: Primitives and Pioneers, released in 2005 by BFI, and The Movies Begin: A Treasury of Early Cinema, 1894-1913, released by Kino International in 2002.
