= Phantom ride =

Early genre of film

A Trip Down Market Street, a phantom ride film shot from a cable car in San Francisco before the 1906 earthquake

Phantom rides or panoramas were an early genre of film popular in Britain and the US at the end of the 19th century. Pre-dating true narrative, the films simply show the progress of a vehicle moving forwards, usually shot by strapping a cameraman to the front. The term phantom ride was applied because the position of the camera meant that only the track and scenery could be seen and the movement appeared to be coming from an invisible force. Though many early films showed local tracks the demand for new footage led to more exotic locations being filmed. This brought a new dimension to the genre, showing foreign lands to those who would otherwise never see them. The genre is also significant, despite its short-lived popularity, due to the role it played in the development of the tracking shot, longer films and film editing, as well as its re-emergence in 4D film and simulation.

== History ==
Most films before phantom rides used static cameras with all the action happening within the scene. This new style of film-making popularised the idea of motion created by the movement of the camera. American Mutoscope's The Haverstraw Tunnel (1897), featuring a train travelling along the West Shore Railroad in New York and then through the eponymous tunnel, and the Lumière brothers' Leaving Jerusalem by Railway (1897), featuring a train leaving Jerusalem, are considered the first examples of the phantom ride genre. The audience were wowed by the speed and unique perspectives that these films introduced, for the first time experiencing the view of travelling while seated in a small hall.

Screenings of The Haverstraw Tunnel (1897) in London in October of that year proved to be an instant success with a reviewer in The Era writing that, "A more exciting and sensational piece of realism has never been presented to an audience." Starting the following year, Mutoscope's British subsidiary filmed and released their own phantom rides, including Conway Castle – Panoramic View of Conway on the L. & N.W. Railway (1898) and Through Chee Tor Tunnel in Derbyshire – Midland Railway, as did rival companies such as the Warwick Trading Company.

The phantom ride genre contributed to the emergence of longer film as distributors grouped their films together to form single journeys, such as the Warwick Trading Company's View from an Engine Front – Through Morthoe (1898) and View from an Engine Front – Ilfracombe Incline (1898) which were made available together as a single continuous length of film. Concurrent technological developments resulted in the Warwick Trading Company's 12-minute epic Dalmeny to Dunfermline, Scotland, via the Firth of Forth Bridge (1899), billed as "the longest, most picturesque and interesting Cinematograph film ever produced."

George Albert Smith's The Kiss in the Tunnel (1899) was a single shot of a couple sharing a brief kiss as their train passes through a tunnel, that was produced to be spliced into existing phantom ride footage, such as Cecil Hepworth's View from an Engine Front – Train Leaving Tunnel (1899), to add interest to the genre. This insertion of a single shot into another film indicates, according to film historian Frank Gray, "a new understanding of continuity film editing," which, "would have a profound impact on the development of editing strategies and become a dominant practice."

The concept of phantom rides was to dramatically change with the opening of Hale's Tours of the World in 1906. A predecessor to modern simulators and 4-D films, these shows involved more than just the projected film footage. The cinema itself was designed to physically mimic the experience of being in the carriage of a train, with piped sounds of train whistles and rushing steam adding to the visuals. The benching was even designed to shake to add realism to the feeling of movement along the track. Hale's Tours were successful enough for them to open four venues in London and several others across the UK.

The rapid development of film-making techniques meant that the audience quickly moved onto other things and by 1910 they no longer accepted these single-shot visuals. Narrative in film progressed and phantom rides were demoted to being one scene out of several in more story-driven movies.

== See also ==
- History of film
