= Santa Claus (1898 film) =

- Screencap from the film
- Directed by: George Albert Smith
- Starring: Laura Bayley; Harold Smith; Dorothy Smith
- Release date: September 1898
- Running time: 1 minute, 16 seconds
- Country: United Kingdom
- Language: Silent

Santa Claus

Santa Claus is an 1898 British silent trick film directed by George Albert Smith, which features Santa Claus visiting a house on Christmas Eve. The film, according to Michael Brooke of BFI Screenonline, "is believed to be the cinema's earliest known example of parallel action and, when coupled with double-exposure techniques that Smith had already demonstrated in the same year's The Mesmerist (1898) and Photographing a Ghost (1898), the result is one of the most visually and conceptually sophisticated British films made up to then." It is sometimes described as the first Christmas film and a technical marvel of its time, although American Mutoscope released Santa Claus Filling Stockings and The Christmas Tree Party a year earlier, in 1897.

== Plot ==
Two children are being put to bed by a maid. She turns off the lights and the children fall asleep. Santa Claus is seen on the roof putting a Christmas tree down the chimney, then following it himself. He enters the room from the fireplace and proceeds to fill the stockings hanging from the children's footboard. He then makes an abrupt gesture of farewell in the children's direction and vanishes. The children wake up and joyfully applaud when they discover the contents of the stockings.

== Cast ==
- Laura Bayley as nurse/maid
- Harold Smith as boy
- Dorothy Smith as girl
- Unknown as Father Christmas

== See also ==
- List of Christmas films
- Santa Claus in film
