= The Little Doctor =

The Little Doctor may refer to:

- The Little Doctor (c. 1901), a short film abridged as Sick Kitten
- Molecular Disruption Device, a concept in the Ender's Game book series.
- Isaac Featherston (1813–1876), New Zealand politician, popularly known as the "Little Doctor"
