= The Haunted Castle (1897 French film) =

- The film
- Directed by: Georges Méliès
- Release date: 1897
- Running time: 45 seconds
- Country: France
- Language: Silent film

Le Château hanté, released in the United States as The Devil's Castle and in Britain as The Haunted Castle, is an 1897 French silent trick film directed by Georges Méliès. It is a remake of a previous film by Méliès, The House of the Devil (Le Manoir du diable, 1896). The 1896 original, which was released in the United States as The Haunted Castle and in Britain as The Devil's Castle, is sometimes confused for the 1897 version. It was the first movie remake.

The 45-second Le Château hanté is about a man who enters a haunted castle and is constantly taunted by spirits within.

== Plot ==
Two men enter a room in a castle; one offers a chair to the other and then exits. The remaining man attempts to sit down, but the chair moves away from him, and he falls to the ground. When the man approaches the chair, it turns into a ghost, then a skeleton, and then an armored knight, before disappearing completely. Turning, the man finds himself confronted by Satan. He attempts to escape, but a ghost blocks his way.

== Production and release ==
The film marks the second appearance of Satan as a character in a Méliès film (the first was Le Manoir du diable the previous year). The special effects in the film were created using the editing technique known as the substitution splice. One moment in the film, the transformation of the ghostly figure into a knight in armor, prefigures numerous sight gags involving armor that became popular during the silent era in comedy films.

Le Château hanté was released by Méliès's Star Film Company and is numbered 96 in its catalogues. The English film pioneer George Albert Smith, a corresponding friend and colleague of Méliès, was among the buyers of the film; Smith himself experimented extensively with similar ghostly topics in his own films made around the same time. Smith is sometimes credited with a lost 1897 film of his own on the same subject, also called The Haunted Castle, but this title may simply be the Méliès film, mistakenly attributed to Smith by later film scholars.

The film was the first Méliès work to be hand-colored at the coloring lab run by Elisabeth Thuillier. A hand-colored print of Le Château hanté survives; its straightforward color scheme uses a red tone to help the characters stand out from the painted backdrop (although the tones also help distract the eye from the editing tricks used). Méliès went on to have Thuillier and her lab workers hand-color many of his films; later collaborations between Méliès and Thuillier were much more elaborate in their use of color.

== See also ==
- List of ghost films
