= The Haunted Castle (1897 British film) =

- Directed by: George Albert Smith (attributed)
- Production company: GAS Films (attributed)
- Release date: 1897
- Running time: 50 feet (about 1 minute)
- Country: United Kingdom
- Language: Silent

The Haunted Castle is a hypothetical lost 1897 short silent film, attributed in some filmographies to the British film pioneer George Albert Smith, but which may be a misidentification of a French film by Georges Méliès.

Many of Smith's films show an interest in supernatural themes, such as Photographing a Ghost (1898), The Haunted Picture Gallery (1899), and his major short comedy Mary Jane's Mishap (1903); he also filmed a version of the Faust legend. A film called The Haunted Castle, supposedly released by Smith in December 1897, was attributed to him in the 1973 edition of The British Film Catalogue.

However, the film historian John Barnes, in his book-length study of the year 1897 in British film, concluded that the title referred to a Méliès film that had been referenced in England since May of that year. Méliès's 1897 film Le Château hanté was indeed released in Britain as The Haunted Castle. (A slightly earlier film of his, Le Manoir du diable, made in the winter of 1896–7, is also known as The Haunted Castle after its American release title.)
