= K. M. Goldney =

British parapsychologist and writer

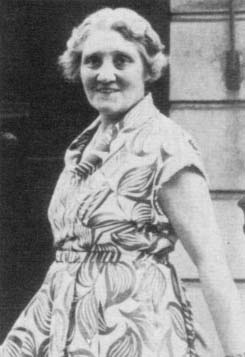
K. M. Goldney

Kathleen Mary Hervey Goldney (1894–1992) best known as K. M. Goldney was a British parapsychologist and writer.

== Career ==
In the 1940s, Goldney worked with the mathematician Samuel Soal on ESP experiments with Basil Shackleton. It later was claimed that Soal had altered and faked the data from the experiments.

Goldney was once a member of the National Laboratory of Psychical Research and an associate of Harry Price. She was a long-standing member of the Society for Psychical Research and worked as secretary from 1949 to 1957.

In the 1950s, she produced a highly critical report with Eric Dingwall and Trevor H. Hall that demolished the claims of any hauntings and suspected Price's involvement with Borley Rectory to be fraudulent.

In 1964, she came out against Trevor H. Hall, defending the chemist William Crookes from allegations of misconduct with the medium Florence Cook.

== Publications ==
- Samuel Soal and K. M. Goldney. (1943). Experiments in Precognitive Telepathy. Proceedings of the Society for Psychical Research 47: 21–150.
- Eric J. Dingwall, K. M. Goldney and Trevor H. Hall. (1956). The Haunting of Borley Rectory: A Critical Survey of the Evidence. Duckworth.
- R. G. Medhurst and K. M. Goldney. (1964). William Crookes and the Physical Phenomena of Mediumship. Proceedings of the Society for Psychical Research 54: 25–156.
- R. G. Medhurst and K. M. Goldney. (1972). Crookes and the Spirit World. Souvenir Press.
- K. M. Goldney. (1974). The Soal-Goldney Experiments with Basil Shackleton (BS): A Personal Account. Proceedings of the Society for Psychical Research 56: 73–82.
