= The Inexhaustible Cab =

1899 film directed by George Albert Smith

The Inexhaustible Cab (1899) is a British short film that was directed by George Albert Smith. Released in the US by S Lubin and Edison Manufacturing Company 29 June 1901.

== Plot ==
A cab is stopped by a man so that several people can be driven to another part of the city. A clown jumps out of the cab and gets all of the people into it, except for an overweight nurse who is carrying a child and is also 400 pounds. The clown takes the child from her and throws it on top of the cab and then the clown uses a board to force the nurse possibly named Bridget into the cab.
