= As Seen Through a Telescope =

1900 British silent short film by George Albert Smith

- Screenshot from the film
- Directed by: George Albert Smith
- Produced by: George Albert Smith
- Cinematography: George Albert Smith
- Production company: G. A. Smith
- Distributed by: Warwick Trading Company
- Release date: September 1900
- Running time: 59 seconds
- Country: United Kingdom
- Language: Silent

As Seen Through a Telescope

As Seen Through a Telescope (AKA: The Professor and His Field Glass) is a 1900 British short silent comedy film, directed by George Albert Smith, featuring an elderly gentleman getting a glimpse of a woman's ankle through a telescope. The three-shot comedy, according to Michael Brooke of BFI Screenonline, "uses a similar technique to that which G.A. Smith pioneered in Grandma's Reading Glass (1900)," and, although "the editing is unsophisticated, the film does at least show a very early example of how to make use of point-of-view close-ups in the context of a coherent narrative (which is this film's main advance on Grandma's Reading Glass)." "Smith's experiments with editing," Brooke concludes, "were ahead of most contemporary film-makers, and in retrospect it can clearly be seen that he was laying the foundations of film grammar as we now understand it."

== Production ==
The film was shot in Furze Hill, Hove, England outside the entrance to St. Ann's Well Gardens, where Smith had his studio.
