= Brighton School (filmmaking) =

English filmmakers active from 1896–1910

Brighton School (fr.: L'école de Brighton) was a loosely associated group of pioneering filmmakers active in the Brighton and Hove area of England from 1896 to 1910. It was mostly a series of shorts and early projects made in the Brighton area.

== History ==
The core membership of the group consists of filmmakers George Albert Smith, James Williamson and Esmé Collings as well as engineer Alfred Darling; other names associated with the group include Collings' former business partner William Friese-Greene and the group's London-based distributor Charles Urban.

While they were not the only early filmmakers working in Britain between the years 1895 and 1907, the group is considered to be the most prolific and influential. They are particularly known for their use of innovative techniques, including colour tinted films, trick photography, the first reverse angle shot in Attack on a China Mission (1900) the first close-up in the film Grandma's Reading Glass (1900) and zoom in the film The Big Swallow (1901), achieved by moving the camera closer to the subject. Smith's The Kiss in the Tunnel (1899) is considered to mark the beginnings of narrative editing.

Despite being known as the Brighton School, both George Albert Smith and James Williamson lived and worked in nearby Hove, where they built film studios on the grounds of their houses. Towards the end of the period, the filmmakers increasingly gave way to their scientific and economic pursuits.

The Hove Museum of Creativity has a permanent exhibition dedicated to the filmmakers.

== Term origins ==
The term was coined by French film historian Georges Sadoul in an article that was translated and re-published in pamphlet form as British Creators of Film Technique by the British Film Institute in 1948.

== See also ==
- Magic lantern
- Home movie
