= A Visit to the Seaside =

1908 short film by George Albert Smith

- A Visit to the Seaside
- Directed by: George Albert Smith
- Produced by: George Albert Smith
- Edited by: George Albert Smith
- Color process: Kinemacolor
- Release date: December 1908 (U.K.)
- Running time: 8 minutes
- Country: United Kingdom
- Language: silent

A Visit to the Seaside (1908) was one of the first successful motion pictures filmed in Kinemacolor. It is an 8-minute short film directed by George Albert Smith of Brighton, showing people doing everyday activities. It is ranked of high historical importance. Kinemacolor later influenced and was replaced by Technicolor, which was used from 1916 to 1952. Smith's was the first film to include colour picture, creating history by being the first non-black and white film around that time.
