= The Beggar's Deceit =

1900 British film by Cecil Hepworth

- Directed by: Cecil Hepworth
- Distributed by: Hepworth Manufacturing Company
- Release date: November 1900 (UK)
- Running time: 58 seconds
- Country: United Kingdom
- Language: silent

The Beggar's Deceit is a 1900 British short film directed by Cecil Hepworth. The film is a comedy sketch shot from a static camera position, with the composition divided into thirds: on the left the beggar, in the centre the pavement and pedestrians, and to the right the road and vehicle traffic.

== Synopsis ==
A legless beggar with a sign around his neck saying "cripple" pushes himself slowly and laboriously on a trolley along the pavement, soliciting alms from sympathetic passers-by. A policeman gradually approaches from the distance. Feeling suspicious, he taps the beggar on the shoulder, whereupon the beggar leaps up in a panic and runs away on his perfectly functional legs. The policeman trips over the trolley before recovering his footing and setting off in pursuit.
