= Samuel Soal =

British mathematician and parapsychologist

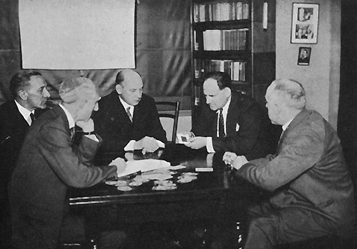
- Samuel Soal (middle) testing Frederick Marion (back right) in a card experiment.
- Occupation: Psychical researcher

Samuel George Soal (1889–1975) was a British mathematician and parapsychologist. He was charged with fraudulent production of data in his work in parapsychology.

== Biography ==
Soal graduated with first class honours in mathematics from Queen Mary College (then East London College) in 1910. After service in World War I, in which he suffered shelling at the Battle of the Somme, he lectured in mathematics at Oxford in the Army School of Education, before returning as a lecturer to Queen Mary College, University of London. In 1944, he was awarded the D.Sc. from Queen Mary College, where he continued to lecture in mathematics until his retirement in 1954. In 1947, he presented the Ninth Myers Memorial Lecture to the Society for Psychical Research, largely on the topic of the card-guessing experiments he had been recently conducting. He served as president of the Society for the years 1950-1952. He was a Fulbright Scholar in 1951, for which he journeyed to the USA to work with J. G. Pratt at Duke University. He was awarded an Honorary Fellowship in Psychology at Birkbeck College, University of London for the years 1954-1958. Thereafter, he moved permanently to Caernarvonshire, Wales, where he had routinely holidayed for each year over the past few decades, and where he died in 1975.

=== Early qualitative studies ===
During this time, Soal demonstrated a personal as well as scientific interest in psychical research, becoming a member of the Society for Psychical Research in October 1922. He was partly moved to make his first parapsychological studies following the death of one of his brothers in the First World War. Like many of the bereaved at the time, he made enquiries of mediums concerning communication with the departed; but conducted his observations with a scientific approach. His observations surprised conventional understanding even within psychical research. Most especially, he reported a case of apparently precognitive telepathy of a situation yet to occur for a long-forgotten, but still living, friend of his, Gordon Davis. This suggested, in line with earlier speculations, that the statements of mediums had nothing to do with "spirits of the departed," but only knowledge gained - by telepathy, if need be - from the sitters themselves. What was particularly surprising was that this information was yet to be learned by Soal himself.

Soal himself practised automatic writing at this time, and pseudonymously authored a much-discussed paper on the scripts he produced, which purported to be authored by the deceased Oscar Wilde. He later himself declaimed the evidentiality of these scripts, and considered that they were largely the product of cryptomnesia.

=== Statistical studies ===
Soal moved to a more statistical and controlled approach, firstly by conducting an experiment in which up to a few hundred persons participated at one time. This involved Soal and a small group of agents enacting a scenario, playing with a certain object, reciting a poem, and so on, which the participants, situated across Great Britain and other countries, were required, at the same time, to attempt to imaginally perceive. The French psychical researcher Rene Warcollier contributed some trials to this research, via his pool of selected participants. While some striking correspondences were obtained, these did not hold up to Soal's statistical scrutiny, and the report of the research commenced with the note that the findings were "entirely negative".

Following popular and academic reports of extra-sensory perception by card-guessing, Soal again changed his research processes and commenced a series of card-guessing experiments in telepathy, including trials canvassed over radio and via the literary magazine John O'London's Weekly. From 1936-1941, he performed over 120,000 trials of card-guessing with 160 participants, finding no evidence of supernatural abilities. In review, he scathingly offered the opinion that telepathy was a merely American phenomenon; he was described by the US researcher, J. B. Rhine, as one of his most harsh and unfair critics.

Next however, upon the hypothesis of Whately Carington, a fellow researcher within the Society for Psychical Research (SPR), Soal was able to report a significant displacement effect in his data for two of his earlier participants. Carington and Soal co-authored a paper on the effect, published in Nature in 1940. Soal thereupon sought to confirm these observations with new studies with these participants: Basil Shackleton (a celebrated London portrait photographer, later to become associated with the "Grape Cure" for cancer) and Gloria Stewart. It was reported that Stewart performed better at chance at naming the card ahead and behind the target card; however, this was not the task, nor was it her intention.

These studies, conducted in collaboration with K. M. Goldney and F. Bateman, were widely reviewed as among the most challenging proofs of precognition and telepathy. Not only were the significances of the studies - in terms of the correspondence between ESP guesses and random targets - extraordinary, the procedures appeared to allow no alternative hypothesis. There was also the testimony of 21 prominent observers who, individually, monitored Soal's work with Shackleton, that they were satisfied with the conditions, and could conceive of no means by which the results could be obtained by normal means other than ESP. Many leading academics, including C. D. Broad and Sir Cyril Burt, were persuaded, largely or partly on the basis of these reports, to lend academic support to psi-related ideas and research.

Arguments against Soal's data have, however, been raised ever since their publication. These proposed "unconscious whispering" (from the experimenter to the ‘agent,’ and then from the ‘agent’ to the ‘percipient’); the inapplicability of probability theory to science (as offered by George Spencer-Brown); and collusion between the ‘agent’ to the ‘percipient’. Outright fraud was also advanced (by George R. Price) and prominently canvassed in the American journal Science. Soal attempted to rebut the critiques.

In 1978, it was reported that Soal evidently appeared to reuse some target sequences from an earlier test in a later one, often reversing, omitting or inserting one or more digits into the sequence before reusing them. It was considered suspicious that a disproportionate number of "hits" occurred on the digits that appeared to interrupt some of the reused sequences. Betty Marwick discovered that Soal had not used the method of random selection of numbers as he had claimed. Marwick showed that there had been manipulation of the score sheets "all the experiments reported by Soal had thereby been discredited."

For two of the 40 sessions with Shackleton, it was claimed that it was "virtually conclusive" that this practice amounted to fraud; and fraud in another six sessions was considered to be "suggestive only". Soal was not able to replicate his earlier work while continuing to conduct telepathy experiments, at the University of London, after his retirement, from 1954 to 1958.

During these years, Soal conducted a long series of apparently successful experiments with a pair of young brothers, as participants, in Northern Wales. Soal reported that the brothers could transmit information to each other via extrasensory perception. This work resulted in Soal's book The Mind Readers, which became a best-seller. This work was immediately and severely criticised on methodological grounds; simulations of the study suggesting that the boys, with their family, could have been successfully undetected in using a code in association with an ultrasonic whistle, perhaps blown by a secreted pump.

It was not until the 1970s, when Soal was already senile and no longer able to respond, that his data were finally deemed insupportable by his fellow parapsychologists. These concerned largely statistical challenges offered by members of the SPR on the basis of several novel analyses they conducted by computer searches of the data from the 1941-1943 study with Shackleton.

The psychologist C. E. M. Hansel has documented the fraud of Soal and the flaws in his experiments.

== Mediumship ==
Distinguished at this time for his contribution to studies of mediumship, Soal was the chosen author for a survey of "Spiritualism", in 55 pages, for the first 1935 publication of the Dictionary of the Occult.

During 1921-1922 Soal carried out a series of séances with the medium Blanche Cooper who claimed to have contacted the spirit of a soldier Gordon Davis and revealed the house he had lived in. In 1925, his report about these séances was published in the Proceedings of the Society for Psychical Research. However, it was discovered that fraud was involved with the case. Davis was alive and Soal altered the records of the sittings after checking out the house. Researcher Melvin Harris noted that:

Mr. Soal was a devious character. And it's clear that in the six weeks at his disposal he had plenty of chance to find out things about number 54. I've visited the house myself and noted that all Soal had to do was walk past the place, then ride past on the double-decker bus and record everything that could be spotted through the plain glass windows.

According to magician Bob Couttie, Soal's co-workers knew that he had fiddled the results but were kept quiet with threats of libel suits.

== See also ==
- K. M. Goldney
