= Tartans of Scottish Clans =

- Screencap from the film
- Directed by: George Albert Smith
- Release date: 1906
- Running time: 1 minute 36 seconds
- Country: United Kingdom
- Language: Silent

Tartans of the Scottish Clans

Tartans of Scottish Clans is a 1906 British short silent documentary film, directed by George Albert Smith as a test for his newly patented Kinemacolor system, which features a sequence of appropriately labelled Scottish tartan cloths, with an abundance of reds and greens, the two colours used by the system. The film, which was one of Smith's first Kinemacolor experiments, was according to Michael Brooke of BFI Screenonline, "a very simple idea which nonetheless demanded colour in order to convey the necessary information."
