= The X-Rays =

1897 British film by George Albert Smith

- Directed by: George Albert Smith
- Produced by: George Albert Smith
- Starring: Tom Green; Laura Bayley
- Cinematography: George Albert Smith
- Production company: G.A. Smith
- Distributed by: Warwick Trading Company
- Release date: October 1897
- Running time: 44 seconds
- Country: United Kingdom
- Language: Silent

The X-Rays (also known as The X-Ray Fiend) is an 1897 British silent comic trick film directed by George Albert Smith, featuring a courting couple exposed to X-rays. The 44-second trick film, according to Michael Brooke of BFI Screenonline, "contains one of the first British examples of special effects created by means of jump cuts" Smith employs the jump-cut twice; first to transform his courting couple via "X rays," dramatized by means of the actors donning black bodysuits decorated with skeletons and with the woman holding only the metal support work of her umbrella, and then to return them and the umbrella to normal. The couple in question were played by Smith's wife Laura Bayley and Tom Green, a Brighton comedian.
