= Janet Oppenheim =

American historian

Janet Oppenheim (1948–1994) was an American historian.

Oppenheim was born in Manhattan. In 1975, she received her PhD in history from Columbia University. She worked as a professor of history at American University.

She is most well known for her scholarly works on British life in the 19th century. She was the author of the book The Other World: Spiritualism and Psychical Research in England, 1850-1914 (1985) which received positive reviews.

== Publications ==
- The Nationalization of Culture: The Development of State Subsidies to the Arts in Great Britain (published under the name Janet Minihan, 1977)
- The Other World: Spiritualism and Psychical Research in England, 1850-1914 (Cambridge University Press, 1985)
- "Shattered Nerves" : Doctors, Patients, and Depression in Victorian England (Oxford University Press, 1991)
