= The House That Jack Built (1900 film) =

- Screenshot from the film
- Directed by: George Albert Smith
- Produced by: George Albert Smith
- Starring: Harold Smith; Dorothy Smith
- Cinematography: George Albert Smith
- Production company: G.A. Smith
- Distributed by: Warwick Trading Company
- Release date: October 1900
- Running time: 54 seconds
- Country: United Kingdom
- Language: Silent

The House That Jack Built and others

The House That Jack Built is a 1900 British short, silent trick film directed by George Albert Smith featuring a boy who knocks over a house made of bricks built by his sister and then rebuilds it when the original sequence is shown in reverse. "In addition to exploiting a popular cinematic trick," of, "reversing the film in the projector," and, "its audience's presumed knowledge of the technique," the director, according to Michael Brooke of BFI Screenonline, "was continuing his experiments with narrative forms," with the reversed sequence, "interpreted as wish-fulfilment on the part of the girl, hoping that time will literally turn back on itself to allow her house to be rebuilt," he, "demonstrates that while this is impossible in reality, it is easily achievable in cinema."
