= Sea Fighting in Greece =

1897 film

- Screenshot from the film
- Directed by: Georges Méliès
- Produced by: Star Film Company
- Distributed by: Star Film Company
- Release date: 1897
- Running time: 20 meters/65 feet
- Country: France
- Languages: Silent; French intertitles

Sea Fighting in Greece (French: Combat naval en Grèce) is an 1897 French short silent war film directed by Georges Méliès. It was released by Méliès' Star Film Company and is numbered 110 in its catalogues. The film, one of a series of events related to the Greco-Turkish War of 1897, is set on the gun deck of a man-of-war ship under attack. In reality, there were no naval clashes during the war.

== Synopsis ==
A naval officer calls his sailors to the deck to assemble around the cannon while he scans the horizon, when the ship is suddenly hit and one of the sailors is injured.

== Production ==
The film is notable for the deck's realistic pitch-and-toss rolling motion, achieved using an articulated film set that rocked side-to-side in front of a stationary camera. This scenic special effect, which Méliès recreated soon after in his film Between Calais and Dover using the same moving platform, allowed for a degree of realism highly unusual for the time. Méliès himself appears in the film as the officer. The film was shot outside in the garden of Méliès's property in Montreuil, Seine-Saint-Denis, with painted scenery.

The film, long presumed lost, was rediscovered by John Barnes in August 1988 in the BFI National Archive, where it had been catalogued under the wrong title.
