= The Kiss in the Tunnel =

1899 film by George Albert Smith

- Screencap from the film
- Directed by: George Albert Smith
- Produced by: George Albert Smith
- Starring: Laura Bayley; George Albert Smith
- Cinematography: George Albert Smith
- Release date: March 1899
- Running time: 1 minute, 3 seconds
- Country: United Kingdom
- Language: Silent

A Kiss in the Tunnel

The Kiss in the Tunnel, also known as A Kiss in the Tunnel, is an 1899 British short silent, comedy film, produced and directed by George Albert Smith, showing a couple sharing a brief kiss as their train passes through a tunnel, which is said to mark the beginnings of narrative editing. The film is the first to feature Laura Bayley, Smith's wife.

The director, according to Michael Brooke of BFI Screenonline, "felt that some extra spice was called for," in the then-popular 'phantom ride' genre, which featured shots taken from the front of a moving train, "and devised a shot showing a brief, almost furtive moment of passion between two passengers, taking advantage of the brief onset of darkness." Just this middle shot was offered by The Warwick Trading Company to exhibitors, who were advised, "to splice it into train footage," such as Cecil Hepworth's View from an Engine Front - Train Leaving Tunnel (1899), "that they almost certainly would own from previous programmes".

This insertion of a single shot into another film indicates, according to film historian Frank Gray, "a new understanding of continuity film editing," which "would have a profound impact on the development of editing strategies and become a dominant practice."

Regarding the film itself, Screenonline reviewer Michael Brooke points out that "the lighting here is totally unrealistic - we can see everything that's going on," and, "no attempt has been made at realism in the setting - the "carriage is very obviously a painted flat that has been decorated with various props: luggage, parasols and so on, though the camera has been made to sway from side to side to create the illusion of movement."

The film was remade under the same title by Bamforth and Company the same year, although they, according to Michael Brooke of BFI Screenonline, "adopted a rather less stylised and noticeably more passionate approach to the brief encounter of the title;" other imitations include S. Lubin's Love in a Railroad Train (1902) and Edwin S. Porter's What Happened in the Tunnel (1903). Due to the film's age, it is public domain worldwide.
