= Between Calais and Dover =

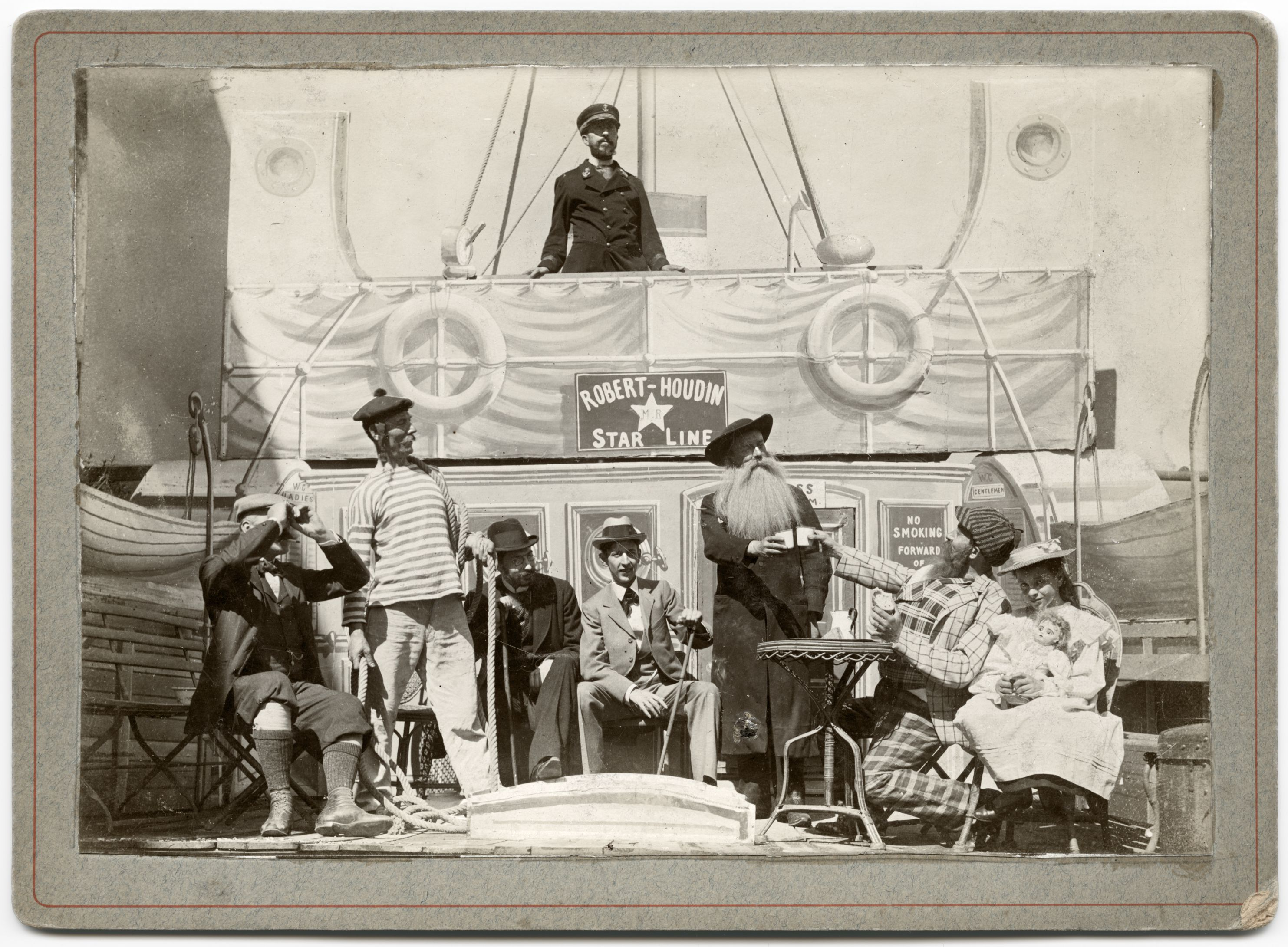
- Production still for the film
- Directed by: Georges Méliès
- Starring: Georges Méliès; Georgette Méliès; Joseph Grapinet
- Production company: Star Film Company
- Release date: 1897
- Running time: Approx. 1 min.
- Country: France
- Language: Silent film

Entre Calais et Douvres, known in English both as Between Dover and Calais and as Between Calais and Dover, is an 1897 short silent comedy film by Georges Méliès.

== Plot ==
Surviving print of the film

On the deck of a steamboat labelled "Robert-Houdin Star Line", passengers experience a rough crossing of the English Channel. Among them, a bewhiskered man in a checked suit attempts to fight off seasickness, a heavily bearded clergyman strikes up conversations with upset travelers, and a captain surveys the pandemonium from an upper deck.

== Production and release ==
The film was filmed outside in the garden of Méliès's property in Montreuil, Seine-Saint-Denis, with painted scenery. The rolling motion of the ship was created by a special articulated platform, built by Méliès for Sea Fighting in Greece the same year. The placard "Robert-Houdin Star Line" refers to Méliès's Théâtre Robert-Houdin as well as to the trademark for his film business, "Star Film". The set of the film also includes a trademark with the initials "M.R.," referring to Méliès and Lucien Reulos, a colleague who was then Méliès's business partner.

The film features Méliès himself as the man in the checked suit; Georgette Méliès, his daughter, as the young girl with the doll; and Joseph Grapinet, a sculptor from Montreuil, as the man who is holding binoculars in the film's surviving production still. The staging gives an early example of Méliès's talent for planning seemingly chaotic comedy scenes; according to film historian John Frazer, "A rough and tumble choreography had been prepared and rehearsed so that in the midst of the general melee significant actions are successively pointed up." Later, more developed examples of this farce choreography in Méliès's work include scenes in The Cook in Trouble (1904) and The Merry Frolics of Satan (1906).

The film was released by Méliès's Star Film Company and is numbered 112 in its catalogues, where it was advertised as a scène comique à bord d'un paquebot ("comic scene on board a steamship"). The first known English-language title for the film is Between Dover and Calais, but the title Between Calais and Dover has also been used in academic writing and for home video release.
