= A Fantastical Meal =

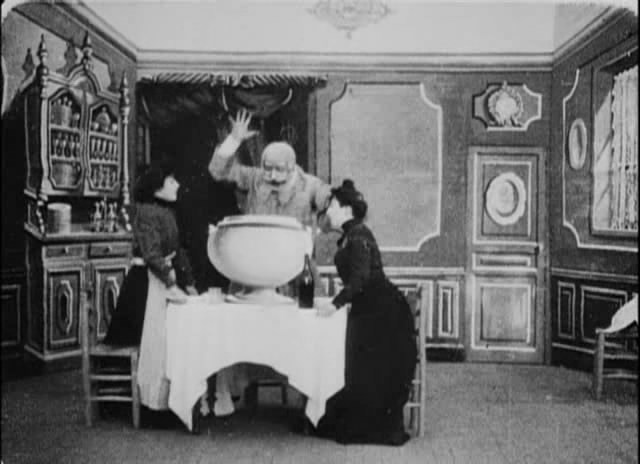
- A frame from the film
- Directed by: Georges Méliès
- Production company: Star Film Company
- Release date: 1900
- Running time: 1 minute
- Country: France
- Language: Silent

A Fantastical Meal (French: Le Repas fantastique) is a 1900 French silent absurdist comedy trick film directed by Georges Méliès and under the Star Film Company.

== Plot ==
A Fantastical Meal (1900)

Two women and a man, attempting to have dinner, find themselves confronted with magical happenings: the chairs move, the soup tureen grows, boots appear from it, the table legs change length, the table appears and reappears. A ghost, dancing on the table, turns into a box of dynamite and explodes, and the man begins tumbling manically around the room.

== Cast ==
Georges Méliès and two uncredited actors.

== Release ==
The film was released by Méliès's Star Film Company and is numbered 311 in its catalogues. It was imitated by Edwin S. Porter for the Edison Manufacturing Company film An Animated Luncheon.
