= Mirographe =

The Mirographe, sold by Reulos, Goudeau and Co. around 1900, was, with the Chrono Pocket Gaumont, one of the French amateur film cameras to use the reduced format.

== Film stock ==
Its films measured 6 meters by 21mm wide and had 80 frames per metre. They did not include perforations, but rather a notch on the side between each frame. The driving of the film was done by a system of "snail" wheel, having a rim about 5mm that was advanced the notch of the film. The diameter of this wheel is constant for 3/4 of the rotation (the image is fixed) and then declined steadily while leading the film, allowing for the film to rest between frames.

== Models ==
There are two models of Mirographe. The first is used for shooting, the direct view and projection of films. A second, type B, was only used for projection.

The Mirographe was also marketed by Mazo and Georges Mendel in 1901.
