= Old Man Drinking a Glass of Beer =

1897 film by George Albert Smith

- Screenshot from the film
- Directed by: George Albert Smith
- Produced by: George Albert Smith
- Starring: Tom Green
- Cinematography: George Albert Smith
- Production company: G.A. Smith
- Release date: September 1897
- Running time: 35 secs
- Country: United Kingdom
- Language: Silent

Old Man Drinking a Glass of Beer

Old Man Drinking a Glass of Beer (AKA: Comic Faces) is an 1897 British short silent comedy film, directed by George Albert Smith, featuring a man drinking a glass of beer whose face and hands become increasingly lively as a result. The 35-second, single-shot film shows comedian Tom Green, according to Bryony Dixon of BFIfilms, "performing what is known as a 'facial', that is a piece direct to camera showing changing facial expressions. The ability to get close up to the star was a great advantage that film had over the stage and early filmmakers were keen to exploit it."
