= Army Life; or, How Soldiers Are Made: Mounted Infantry =

1900 British silent short film by Robert W. Paul

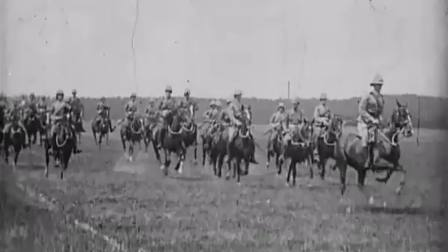
- Screenshot from the film
- Directed by: Robert W. Paul
- Produced by: Robert W. Paul
- Cinematography: Robert W. Paul
- Production company: Paul's Animatograph Works
- Release date: 18 September 1900
- Running time: 27 seconds
- Country: United Kingdom
- Language: Silent

Army Life; or, How Soldiers Are Made: Mounted Infantry is a 1900 British short black-and-white silent propaganda actuality film, directed by Robert W. Paul, featuring the King's Own Royal Lancaster Regiment riding over a plain. The film, which premiered on 18 September 1900 at the Alhambra Theatre in London, England, "is all that appears to remain of one of R.W. Paul's most ambitious projects," which, according to Micahael Brooke of BFI Screenonline, "had it survived in a more complete form," "would undoubtedly be considered one of the most important precursors of the modern documentary."

The original two-hour programme was shown in two parts; the first covered the process from recruitment to initial training, and contained five sections: Joining the Army, Training at the Regimental Depot, Camp Life at Aldershot, Army Gymnastics at the Central Gymnasium, Aldershot and The Comissionaire Corps; while the second explored the various branches of the army, and included Training of Cavalry at Canterbury, Royal Army Medical Corps, Royal Horse Artillery at Woolwich, Army Service Corps, Garrison Artillery, Infantry (from which this surviving fragment comes) and Royal Engineers.

The film is included on the BFI DVD R.W. Paul: The Collected Films 1895-1908.
