= The Haverstraw Tunnel =

- Production company: American Mutoscope Company
- Release date: 1897
- Running time: 1538 frames
- Country: United States
- Language: Silent

The Haverstraw Tunnel is an early black and white silent film released in 1897 by the American Mutoscope Company. It is considered to be one of the first examples of a phantom ride (along with Alexandre Promio's Leaving Jerusalem by Railway the same year) and features a train travelling along the West Shore Railroad in Rockland County, New York and then through the eponymous tunnel.

== Reception ==
The Haverstraw Tunnel became one of Mutoscope's most popular films. A review of the film was published in a February 1, 1898 Worcester, Massachusetts newspaper that mentioned:

the famous Haverstraw tunnel picture makes the hit which has been usual with its presentation since the pictures were first put on, and the audiences leave the theater with a feeling that they have seen something unusually fine, which really is the case.

— film reviewer, Worcester Telegram

A review appeared in the January 22, 1898 Tatler of St. Augustine, Florida and commented on the effect the film had upon audiences at the Hotel Alcazar at the time:

When the last scene appeared, and the audience passed by beautiful scenery through Haverstraw tunnel and out again along the banks of the historic Hudson, their enthusiasm was boundless. While the audience was a good one, had the people of St. Augustine had the least idea of what the show would be, the great hall would have been crowded. We bespeak a full house tonight.

— film reviewer, The Tatler
