= John Barnes (film historian) =

British film historian (1920-2008)

- Born: 28 June 1920; London, England
- Died: 1 June 2008 (aged 87)
- Education: Canford School
- Notable work: The Beginnings of the Cinema in England
- Awards: Jean Mitry prize by the Pordenone Silent Film Festival; Honorary doctorate, University of Stirling

John Stuart Lloyd Barnes (28 June 1920 – 1 June 2008) was a British film historian specialising in the early history of cinema. He co-founded the Barnes Museum of Cinematography with his brother William. The museum was one of the first museums devoted to film and became a focal point for scholars worldwide. Barnes is best known for a five-volume history of film titled The Beginnings of the Cinema in England, 1894-1901. He was survived by his partner, brother, and son William

== Early life ==
Barnes and his twin brother William (Bill) were born in London in 1920. Their father, who was involved in the family business of the piano makers W.H. Barnes, died when they were 12 years old. Seeing the children stuck in the house with grieving adults, an uncle gave them a 9.5 mm film projector as a distraction and the brothers’ interest in film was born. Once they acquired a camera, John and Bill spent their holidays making films about coastal and rural life in Kent and Cornwall. Two of their 16mm, black and white silent films, Gem of the Cornish Riviera (1936) and Cornish Nets (1938) depict aspects of the fishing industry in St Ives and around the Cornish coast. The films were specially commended by the Board of the Amateur Cine World and are now recognized as an important documentary record of the time.

== Cinematographic works ==
- The Fatal Shot (1933)
- Chilham (A Kentish Village) (1934)
- Kidnapped. Black Feet Indians (1935)
- A Filmic Review No: 1 (ca. 1934 - 1935)
- Lenham (A Kentish Village) (1936)
- O’ Famous Kent (1936)
- A Filmic Review No. 2 (1934-1936)
- The Wheat Harvest (1935)
- Here and There [Afternoon Tea with Sickert] (1937)
- Paris (1937)
- The Gem of the Cornish Riviera (1936)
- Venice (ca. 1938)
- In the Garden of England (ca.1938)
- With the Gypsies in Kent (1938)
- Seaside and Coastal Views (ca. 1939)
- Cornish Nets (1938)
- Soho Fair (1939)

== Education ==
John and Bill attended the Canford School in Wimborne, Dorset. Their interest in film continued during their school years where they established and ran the school cinema. John is listed as one of Canford's notable alumni.

After leaving school, the brothers studied film design and technique Edward Carrick's AAT film school. It was during this time that they began collecting Victorian optical toys and associated literature. This was the beginning of a journey that culminated in the Museum of Cinematography.

== Museum of cinematography ==
John and Bill collected artefacts and documents from the 17th to the 20th centuries which included magic lanterns, shadow play, panoramas, dioramas, silhouettes, peepshows, and the early forms of cinema to document the history of motion pictures.

The brothers moved to St Ives after their service in the Royal Navy during World War II. It was during this time that their focus shifted from film making to collecting and researching aspects of cinematography. They opened a second-hand bookshop specializing in books devoted to the moving image and John began to research and write on the histories associated with their collection.

It was in the rooms above the shop that the brothers put on the first exhibition of their film history artefacts. The exhibition was a success and encouraged the brothers to continue their collection initiatives.

Relatively little was appreciated about pre-cinema technologies at this time and John's work was not only to collect cinema related objects but to understand, explain, and contextualize them. One of John's early essays explored the invention of John Ayrton Paris’ Thaumatrope (the name roughly translates into Wonder-Turner from ancient Greek) and examined the origins of this early 19th-century philosophical toy and its place in the evolution of vision technology.

Eventually, the brothers closed the bookshop and sold their collection by catalogue alone, supplying books and artefacts to scholars and film museums around the world. In 1963, Bill went filming overseas, and John and his wife Carmen opened the Barnes Museum of Cinematography in St Ives to display the wondrous collection which the brothers had amassed. The museum’s famed collection drew film scholars from around the world and its catalogues became important documentary sources as serious interest grew in the history of cinema. John and Bill continued collecting and many objects were lent to museums around the world.

The Museum never found a London home, as John had hoped, and closed in 1986. The brothers, having seen the collections of the Science Museum, the Kodak Museum, and the Royal Photographic Society all swallowed up by the National Museum of Film and Photography with most of the displays relegated to the archive, did not wish their collection to end up in a British National Institution. For this reason, the Barnes’ unparalleled collection was acquired by the Museo Nazionale del Cinema of Turin in the 1990s, where it is now displayed, while much of the remainder is now housed in the Hove Museum and Art Gallery, near Brighton.

== Greatest achievement ==
John's greatest contribution to the history of cinematography is the book The Beginnings of the Cinema in England. The work was based on careful examination of surviving films, mostly those from the collection of the British Film Institute. He studied business records, venue programmes, and autobiographical accounts. He also delved into trade periodicals relevant to film and the complementary subjects of the music hall, photography, and the magic lantern.

John began the work in 1976, documenting the arrival of film in England (1894-1896). The book traced the history of film through the machinery and then the personalities involved in the art, through to modes of exhibition and a thorough filmography for the period. He continued to document the history of cinema in England with volumes focused on 1897, 1898, 1899, and 1900. The whole series was eventually republished in a uniform edition by University of Exeter Press in 1998.

== Personal life ==
In 1997, John and Bill were awarded the Jean Mitry prize by the Pordenone Silent Film Festival in Italy for their distinguished contribution to silent cinema and in 2006 both brothers received an honorary doctorate from the University of Stirling in Scotland.

John, a pioneer in his field, devoted his life to the history of cinema. He was an independent scholar-collector who faced innumerable battles with publishers and institutions. John passionately defended his own interpretations of the history of film. He was the epitome of the independent researcher and worked steadfastly for decades without any institutional support. His knowledge, unfailing help, and sturdy friendship were valued by scholars and enthusiasts around the world.

“While other areas of academic cinema history seem doomed to atrophy, as films that were once entertaining no longer entertain, Victorian cinema is alive with debate and discovery … This is perhaps Barnes’ greatest achievement, to have achieved the trick that film has always claimed to do, to abolish time.” urbanora

Barnes died from cancer in June 2008, aged 87.
