= An Hallucinated Alchemist =

L'hallucination de l'alchimiste
- Directed by: Georges Méliès
- Production company: Star Film Company
- Release date: 1897
- Running time: 20 meters (approx. 1.1 minutes)
- Country: France
- Language: Silent

An Hallucinated Alchemist (French: L'hallucination de l'alchimiste), also known as The Alchemist's Hallucination, is an 1897 French silent trick film directed by Georges Méliès. This film is lost. The videos online are not this film, but actually of The Mysterious Retort (1906).

== Plot ==
The film features a star with five female heads and a giant face that has people coming out of its mouth.

== Production ==
The sets were hand painted.

== Release and influence ==
The film was released by Méliès's Star Film Company and is numbered 95 in its catalogues. The film is currently presumed lost.

The 1900 Edison Manufacturing Company short The Clown and the Alchemist, directed by J. Stuart Blackton and Albert E. Smith, may have been inspired by this film.
