= Départ de Jérusalem en chemin de fer =

- Directed by: Alexandre Promio
- Produced by: Auguste and Louis Lumière
- Distributed by: Auguste and Louis Lumière
- Release date: 1897
- Country: France
- Languages: Silent film French intertitles

Départ de Jérusalem en chemin de fer (translated into English as Leaving Jerusalem by Railway) is an 1897 film directed by Alexandre Promio and released by the Lumière brothers. Lasting for roughly 50 seconds, it shows the goodbyes of many passersby - first Europeans, then Palestinian Arabs, then Palestinian Jews - as a train leaves Jerusalem.

== Legacy ==
Leaving Jerusalem by Railway contains what is possibly the first depiction of camera movement in the history of film. Some instead credit The Haverstraw Tunnel with this innovation, but only the year of release is available for the two; therefore it is unknown which came first.

The film holds the rare distinction of being among the 19th century films voted for in the British Film Institute's decennial Sight & Sound poll: director Patrick Keiller ranked it one of the 10 greatest motion pictures ever made.

== See also ==
- Lumière
- Alexandre Promio
