= Photographing a Ghost =

- Directed by: George Albert Smith
- Release date: 1898
- Country: United Kingdom
- Language: Silent film

Photographing a Ghost (1898) is a silent short film directed by George Albert Smith. It is about photographers that try, but repeatedly fail, to take a picture of a ghost.

== See also ==
- List of ghost films
