= Douglas Blackburn =

English journalist and novelist

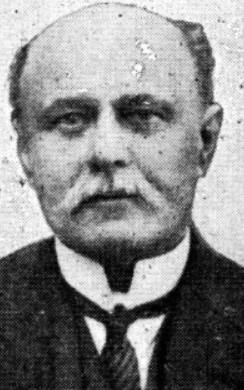
- Born: 6 August 1857; Southwark, England
- Died: 28 March 1929 (aged 71); Tonbridge, England
- Occupations: Journalist and writer

Douglas Blackburn (6 August 1857, Southwark – 28 March 1929, Tonbridge) was an English journalist and novelist, who worked in the Transvaal and Natal between 1892 and 1908. He has been called "the great chronicler of the last days of the Boer republic."

== Telepathy experiments ==
During 1882-1883, Blackburn with George Albert Smith took part in a series of experiments that were claimed to be genuine evidence for telepathy by members of the Society for Psychical Research. Blackburn later made a public confession of fraud, stating that the results had been obtained by use of a code.

Blackburn's Confessions of a Telepathist: Thirty-Year Hoax Exposed appeared in The Daily News and the Journal of the Society for Psychical Research, 1911. It was re-printed in A Skeptic's Handbook of Parapsychology, 1985.

== Works ==
Novels

- Prinsloo of Prinsloosdorp: A Tale of Transvaal Officialdom, 1899
- A Burgher Quixote, 1903
- Richard Hartley, Prospector, 1904
- I Came and Saw, 1908
- Leaven: a black and white story, 1908
- Love Muti, Everett's, 1915

Non-fiction

- Thought-Reading, or, Modern Mysteries Explained: Being Chapters on Thought-Reading, Occultism, Mesmerism, &c., Forming a Key to the Psychological Puzzles of the Day, 1884
- (with W. Waithman Caddell) The Detection of Forgery: A Practical Handbook For the Use of Bankers, Solicitors, Magistrates' Clerks, and All Handling Suspected Documents, 1909
- Confessions of a Telepathist, 1911
- (with W. Waithman Caddell) Secret Service in South Africa, 1911
- The Martyr Nurse: The Death and Achievement of Edith Cavell, 1915
