= St. Ann's Well Gardens, Hove =

Public park in Hove, England

Coordinates: 50°49′46″N 00°09′24″W

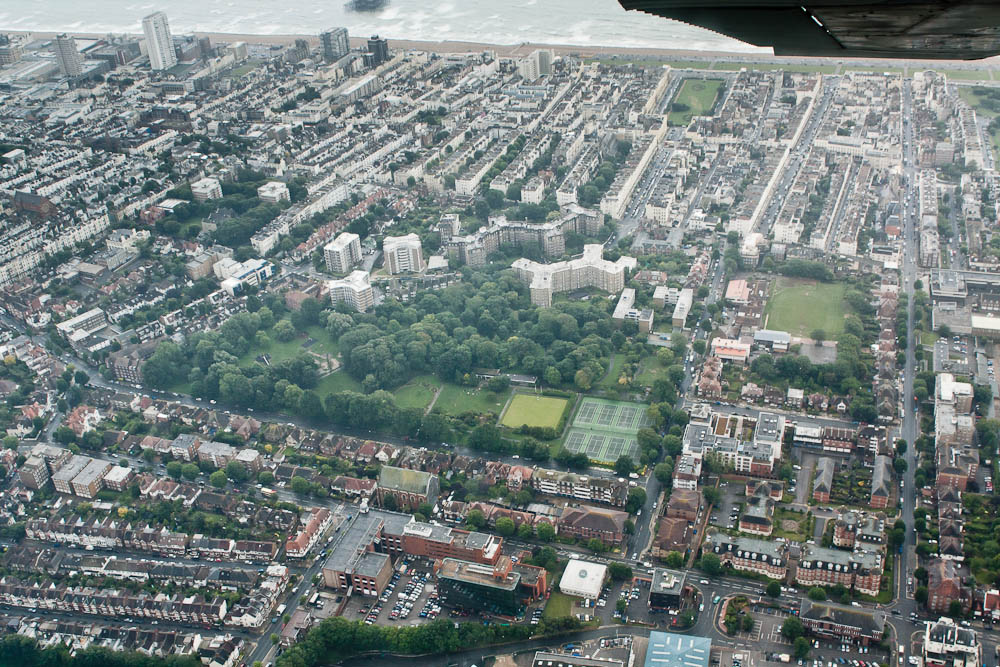
From a light aeroplane

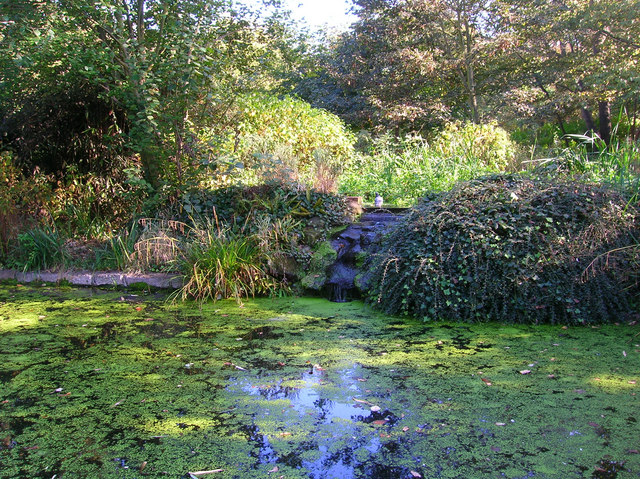
The park's fish pond, October 2007

St. Ann's Well Gardens is a park in Hove, East Sussex, about half a mile from the shore. The park is renowned for its chalybeate (iron bearing) spring, which is now named St. Ann's Well. In this case, the name "St. Ann" does not refer to any saint. Instead, the name was apparently based on a myth of Annafrieda, a Saxon lady whose lover was murdered. Her tears miraculously became the Chalybeate Spring which is now called St. Ann's Well.

== Description ==
St. Ann's Well Gardens has many native and exotic trees. It also has a scented garden that allow the visitor to experience many different smells.

St. Ann's Well Gardens is owned and operated by Brighton and Hove City Council. As well as the scented garden, the park has playgrounds for children, with swings, slides etc. Dogs are forbidden in the children's areas, while the rest of the park is a popular place for local residents to exercise their pets.

In addition there are the following facilities:

- eight tennis courts
- a café
- toilets
- a fish pond
- conservation areas where natural flora are left undisturbed.

The park can be accessed by Nizells Avenue, Furze Hill and Somerhill Road.

== History ==
=== Early history ===
The chalybeate spring in St. Ann's Well Gardens might have been known for many years. The City Parks web site notes that the chalybeate spring in St. Ann's Well Gardens is the endpoint of a ley line.

St. Ann's Well Gardens was part of the Wick Estate in the Middle Ages, which was a strip of land that extended inland to the edge of Preston manor. The Wick Estate was owned by the Stapley family from 1573 until 1701 when it was sold to a family of Brighton brewers, the Scutts.

=== Health spa established under the Scutts ===
There was a health spa named the Chalybeate Spa in Hove featuring the St. Ann's Well spring operating as early as the 18th century. At that time, the spring had considerably greater flow than it does at present. In the 1760s, the Scutts made a number of improvements associated with the spring. Around 1800 an elaborate "pump room" was built over the spring, housing assorted facilities and accommodating the large numbers who came seeking therapeutic relief at that time. At the pumphouse at the top of the hill in the park, people could drink the brown waters of the spring (at some times of the year, the waters are closer to yellow).

This area became a popular destination, and some of them came to enjoy the Chalybeate Spa at St. Ann's Well. Many people came to the area to enjoy the shore, and other attractions. There were pleasure gardens at the Georgian and Regency Seaside Resorts in neighbouring Brighton at the time.

In the early 19th century, the Reverend Thomas Scutt redesigned the pump room building. Rev. Scutt added a colonnade which was featured in many prints.

In 1825, Rev. Scutt sold off part of the Wick Estate. This land became the Brunswick Estate.

=== Goldsmid ownership ===
In 1830 the remaining land in the Wick Estate was sold to financier and philanthropist Sir Isaac Lyon Goldsmid, who moved into the Wick Lodge. Sir Isaac Goldsmid was the first to create the gardens that now exist. When Sir Isaac died in 1859, members of the Goldsmid family that inherited the Goldsmid Estate continued to develop the gardens and surrounding area.

Mrs Fitzherbert wrote that "....the waters have wonderfully improved my health and strength." after a visit to the Spa in 1830. In 1882 the Brighton Gazette wrote that St. Ann's Well was 'one of the finest springs in Europe'. However, the distance of the Spa from Brighton, competition from other facilities, and a slow decline in the flow of the spring lead to the spa's declining popularity, and it eventually closed. The fields around the spring were dug up to use in the local brick-making business. The places where the mud was removed to make bricks are still visible in the park.

=== Smith's pleasure gardens ===
In 1894 (some sources give a date of 1892), George Albert Smith (1864–1959), a pioneer in the film industry, leased St Ann's Well Gardens from the Goldsmid family. He was devoted to commercially developing the gardens, which he named "St. Anne's Well Pleasure Gardens". Smith's pleasure gardens included novelties such as demonstrations of hot air ballooning and parachute jumps, a monkey house, a fortune teller and a hermit living in a cave.

In addition, Smith used the pump house as a film laboratory and produced about 50 short films a year there. Some claim that this was the birthplace of film editing. Later, Smith had a glass house film studio built on the grounds.

In 1904, A. H. Tee took over the lease on St Ann's Well Gardens from G. Albert Smith, as Smith moved his film businesses to another site.

=== Public park ===
In 1908, the local authorities bought the gardens for £10,000 and the park was opened to the public on Empire Day in 1908.

There was a clock in front of the old pumphouse, donated by Mrs Flora Sassoon, widow of wealthy business man Sassoon David Sassoon of Ashley Park near Walton-on-Thames, who had relocated to Hove with many other members of the Sassoon family. In 1913 Mrs Sassoon also bought and donated 1 acre (0.40 ha) of land which became the croquet lawns (now the lawn bowling facility). She also donated turf, croquet equipment, summer houses, statues and similar decorative items.

Because the spring's flow had slowed, the pump room was demolished in 1935, and a mock wellhead was installed in its place. After the local government bought the park, neighbouring buildings like the Grasshopper Cottage, near the bowling green, and the Wick Farmhouse were incorporated into the park, but these were demolished after the second World War. A Swiss chalet-style cafe was replaced by a modern building in the 1970s. These changes were met with some local protest, but to no avail.

In the months leading up to the park's centenary, interest in a celebration led to the formation of a Friends group for the park. On 24 May 2008 a 100th birthday party was held, and the group continues to celebrate the park and arrange regular events.

== Bibliography ==
- Middleton, Judy (2002). The Encyclopaedia of Hove & Portslade. Brighton: Brighton & Hove Libraries.
