= Laura Bayley =

British actress and filmmaker (1862–1938)

- Bayley (at right), with George Albert Smith, in The Kiss in the Tunnel (1899)
- Born: 4 February 1862; Ramsgate, England
- Died: 25 October 1938 (aged 76); Hove, England
- Other names: Laura Eugenia Smith; Mrs. George Albert Smith
- Occupations: Actress, filmmaker
- Spouse(s): George Albert Smith (m. 1888)

Laura Eugenia Bayley (4 February 1862 – 25 October 1938) was a British actress and filmmaker, active in the Brighton School of early cinema pioneers. Born in Ramsgate, Bayley performed onstage in Victorian burlesques, revues, and pantomimes, often with her three sisters. After marrying the showman George Albert Smith, she entered the world of early experiments with motion picture film; she played main roles in many of the most important films Smith made between 1897 and 1903, including The Kiss in the Tunnel (1899) and Mary Jane's Mishap (1903).

Behind the camera, Bayley likely played a significant hand in the creative development of Smith's fiction films and may have directed some of those currently credited to him. She also directed and supervised numerous other films on her own, including a series for an early show-at-home projector design. Film historians have highlighted her prolific career as a film performer and the creative talent she brought to filmmaking.

== Early life and stage career ==
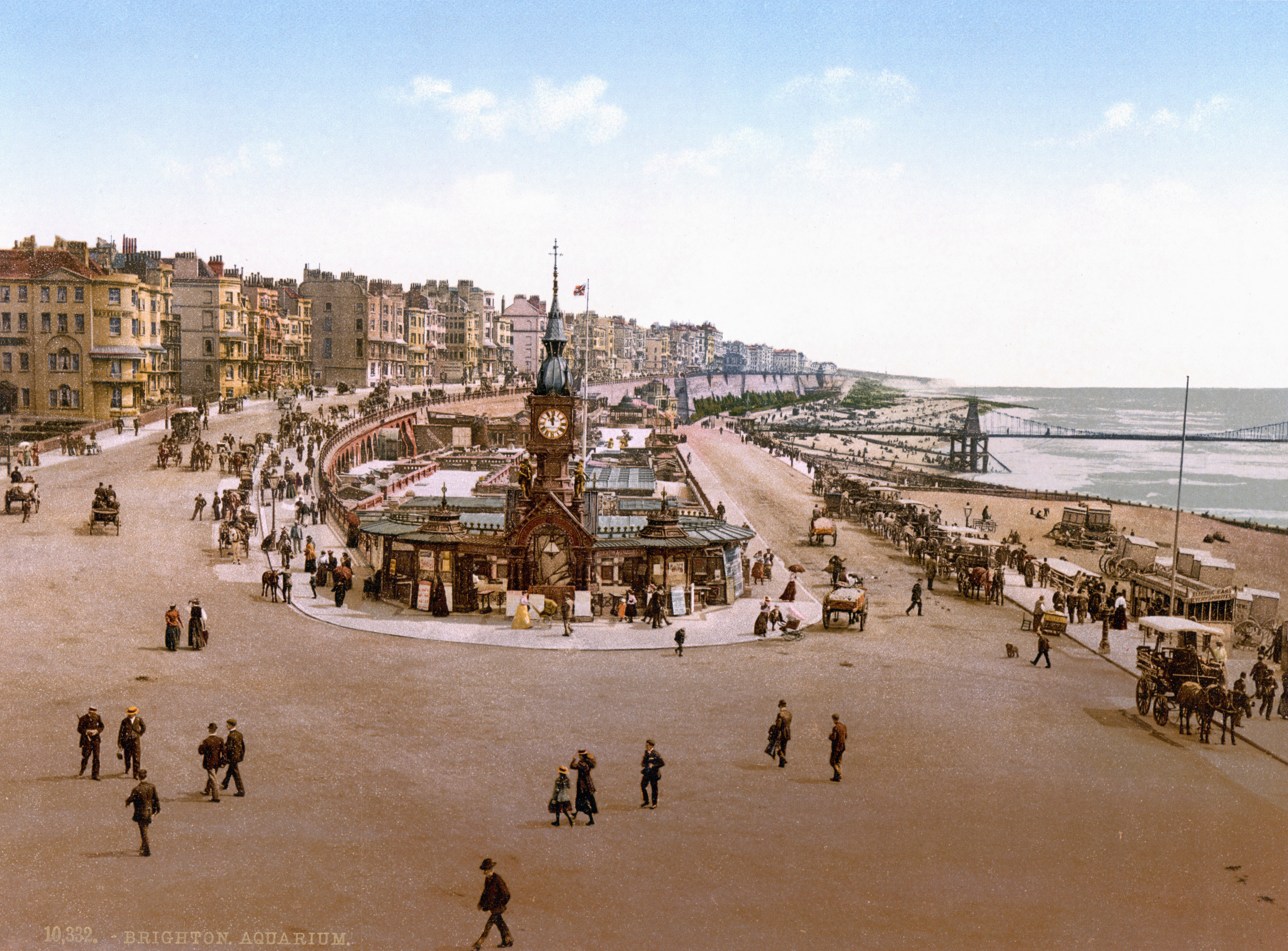
The Brighton Aquarium, where Bayley and her sisters performed in Victorian burlesques

Bayley was born on 4 February 1862 in the English seaside town of Ramsgate. She and her sisters, Blanche, Florence, and Eva, worked together as performers for J. D. Hunter's Theatre Company, which produced a "burlesque" extravaganza yearly at the Brighton Aquarium. The Brighton Society, in 1887, praised "the Misses Bayley … who, by their charming vocal selections, added so considerably to the success of the burlesque Brown and the Brahmins".

Bayley's three sisters also performed without her for some Aquarium productions, such as in the pantomimes Cinderella and Dick Whittington in August 1890 and again in the latter in 1892. Still, the four sisters were reunited at the Aquarium for Babes in the Wood in 1894, about which the Brighton Herald commented that "The Robin Hood of Miss Laura Bayley is a distinctly comely and cheery Robin Hood."

On 13 June 1888, at the Congregational Church in Ramsgate, Bayley married George Albert Smith. Smith, known as "Bertie" among his professional colleagues, was a young stage entertainer, performing hypnosis acts and second sight routines in local venues, including the Brighton Aquarium. Bayley and Smith married in a double wedding: the other couple was Bayley's sister Florence and the Bayleys' theatrical colleague J. D. Hunter.

Bayley and Smith had two children, Harold Norman and Dorothy Eugenie, in 1889 and 1890, respectively. In 1892, Smith acquired a lease on St. Ann's Well and Wild Garden, a pleasure garden in Brighton; it reopened under his management the following spring. Bayley and Smith held summer fancy dress parties at the garden, attended by as many as 2,000 costumed patrons. Smith also gave magic lantern performances and dioramic lectures, and exhibited the newly invented Edison phonograph, as part of the garden's entertainments.

== Film career ==
Bayley in costume for Mary Jane's Mishap (1903)

Smith's interest in novel forms of entertainment led him towards early experiments with motion picture film, and in 1897, he began making short films on the St. Ann's Well grounds. By the time of Smith's foray into filmmaking, Bayley had wide experience in comic acting for pantomime and revues. Smith drew extensively on her knowledge of visual humour and audience tastes. She played lead roles in many of his most significant films, including Hanging out the Clothes (1897), Santa Claus (1898), Cinderella (1898), The Kiss in the Tunnel (1899), As Seen Through the Telescope (1900), Let Me Dream Again (1900), Dorothy's Dream (1900), and Mary Jane's Mishap (1903). In at least one instance, Smith and Bayley mixed their theatrical and film work: when J. D. Hunter's company toured Dick Whittington in early 1897, Bayley and her sister Blanche performed live onstage, while Smith came along on the tour to exhibit his "animated photographs" as part of the entertainment.

Other members of Bayley's family also became involved in Smith's filmmaking; all three of her sisters probably appeared in the films, as did Smith and Bayley's two children. Notably, the film historian Frank Gray concludes that Harold and Dorothy Smith probably appear in Santa Claus and The House that Jack Built, and Harold also plays the grandson in Grandma's Reading Glass.

During her acting career, Bayley also worked as a filmmaker, making numerous short films designed and marketed for a home projector, the Biokam. Smith and Bayley probably worked in creative collaboration to devise the fiction films Smith directed; Bayley may also have directed some of the films currently credited to Smith, as his records indicate that she supervised the "facials" (comic short films emphasising facial expression). Bayley handled sales of the Biokam films and related materials, and may also have participated in making cameras.

Later in the decade, after the series of Biokam films, Bayley also appeared in some of Smith's 1906–1908 tests of the colour-film process Kinemacolor. Bayley died at home at 7 Melville Road, Hove, on 25 October 1938.

== Legacy ==
Bayley's work was usually overlooked in twentieth-century assessments of the Brighton School, with some film historians simply calling her "Smith's wife" or "Mrs. Smith." Several twenty-first-century film historians have drawn attention to this neglect and her contributions, though she remains relatively little-known in the field. The British Film Institute's Screenonline database ranks Bayley as "the most prolific British actress" in turn-of-the-century cinema. In programme notes for the Pordenone Silent Film Festival, where three Bayley films were shown in 2002, the film historian David Robinson cited Bayley and her sisters as the first known comediennes in British film. In a 2016 study of women working behind the camera in early film, the film writer Ellen Cheshire identified Bayley as film history's first woman cinematographer.

In a discussion of Bayley's collaboration with Smith, the film historian Frank Gray wrote: "Laura Bayley brought to this creative work a keen understanding of popular texts, an unself-conscious and dynamic style of acting and a rich sense of humour. Audiences who still laugh at her winking at the camera while watching Mary Jane's Mishap acknowledged her considerable achievement."
