= The House of the Devil (1896 film) =

Silent film by Georges Méliès

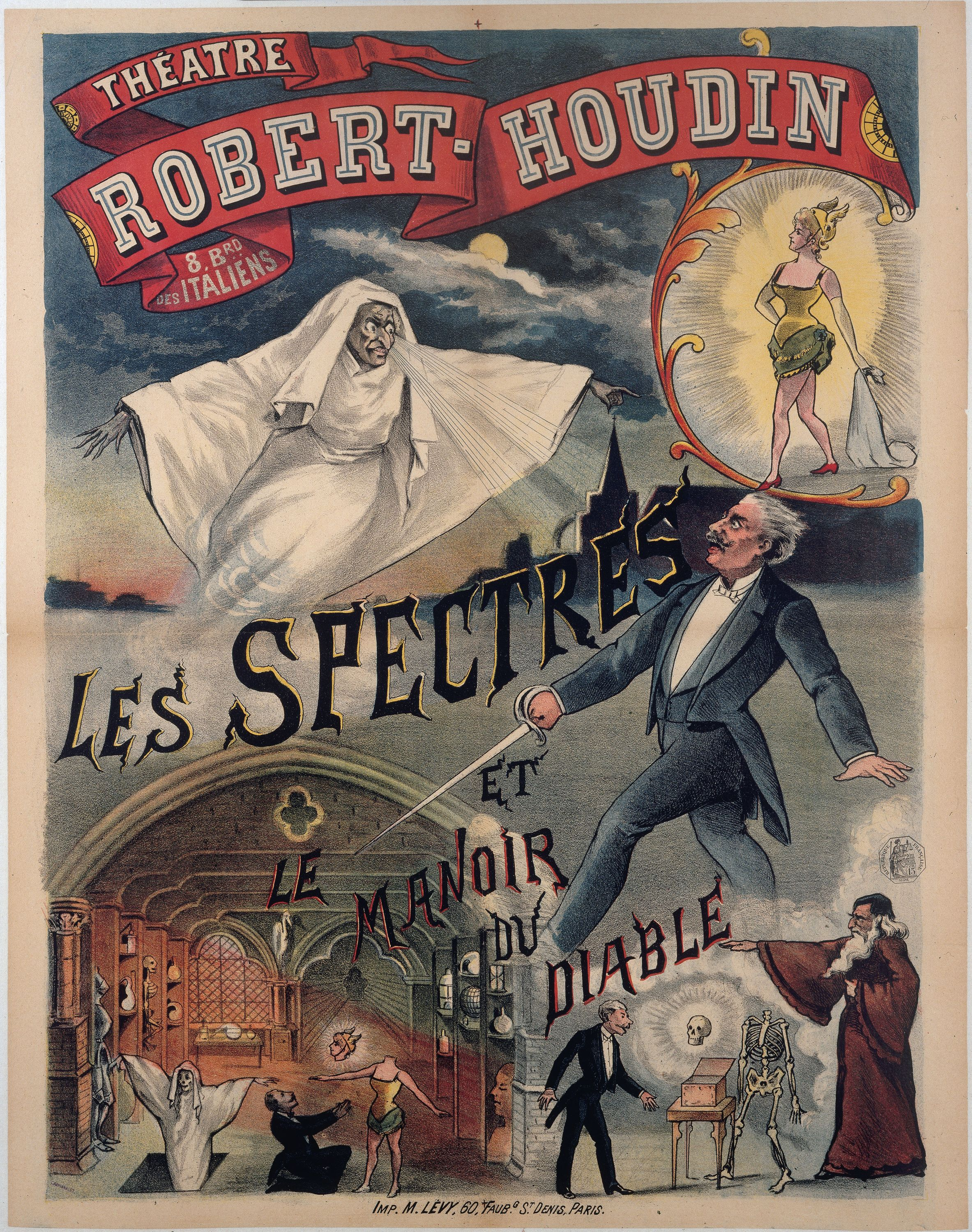
- Poster of the film
- Directed by: Georges Méliès
- Produced by: Georges Méliès
- Starring: Jehanne D'Alcy; Jules-Eugène Legris
- Production company: Star Film Company
- Release date: 24 December 1896
- Running time: 60 meters (3 minutes)
- Country: France
- Language: Silent

The House of the Devil (French: Le Manoir du diable, lit. 'The Devil's Manor'), released in the United States as The Haunted Castle and in the United Kingdom as The Devil's Castle, is an 1896 French silent trick film directed by Georges Méliès. The film, which depicts a brief pantomimed sketch in the style of a theatrical comic fantasy, tells the story of an encounter with the Devil and various attendant phantoms. It is intended to evoke amusement and wonder from its audiences, rather than fear. However, because of its themes and characters, the film has been considered to technically be the first horror film. Such a classification can also be attributed to the film's depiction of a human transforming into a bat, a plot element which has led some observers to label the work the first vampire film. The film is also innovative in length; its running time of over three minutes was ambitious for its era.

A single remake, also by Méliès, was produced one year later under the title Le Château hanté (The Haunted Castle), which is often confused with this film.

The film was presumed lost until 1988, when a copy was found in the New Zealand Film Archive.

== Plot ==
The full film

The film opens with a giant bat flying into a medieval castle. The bat circles the room, before suddenly changing into the Devil. Mephistopheles produces a cauldron and an assistant, who helps him conjure a woman from the cauldron.

The room clears shortly before two cavaliers enter. The Devil's assistant pokes their backs before instantaneously teleporting to different areas of the room, confusing the pair and causing one to flee. The second stays and has several other tricks played on him, such as furniture moving around and the sudden appearance of a skeleton. The cavalier draws his sword and attacks the skeleton, which turns into a bat, then into Mephistopheles, who conjures four shrouded spectres to subdue the man and then vanish. As the dazed man recovers from the spectres' attack, Mephistopheles ushers in the woman from the cauldron, who impresses the cavalier with her beauty. As he kneels to kiss her hand, she turns into a withered old crone, then raises her stick and turns into a group of six crones.

The second cavalier returns and, after a brief show of bravery, escapes the crones by leaping over the balcony's edge. The crones dance in a circle and vanish, and the Devil once again confronts the first cavalier, who brandishes a large crucifix and repels the Devil with it.

== Production ==
The Haunted Castle was filmed outdoors in the garden of Méliès's property in Montreuil, Seine-Saint-Denis, with painted scenery.

In Méliès's era, film actors performed anonymously and no credits were provided. However, it is known that Jehanne d'Alcy, a successful stage actress who appeared in many of Méliès's films and became his mistress and later his second wife, plays the woman who comes out of the cauldron. The film historian Georges Sadoul hypothesized that the Devil in the film was played by Jules-Eugène Legris, a magician who performed at Méliès's Théâtre Robert-Houdin in Paris and who later made an appearance in Méliès's famous 1902 film A Trip to the Moon.

The film was released by Méliès's studio, commonly known as the Star Film Company, and numbered 78–80 in its catalogues at the Theater Robert-Houdin (8 Boulevard Des Italiens, Paris). It remains unknown whether the film was released at the end of the year 1896 or at the beginning of 1897, but it should not be confused with Le Château hanté, made by Méliès later in 1897 and also released as The Haunted Castle.

== Reception ==
In the book Universal Monsters: Origins, Christopher Ripley writes, "If Méliès was shooting for terror, he fell short of the mark. Initially the film was amusing to its audience, rather than terror-inducing... What was also notable about the film was Méliès' use of cinematography to morph characters into other characters. Though technology did not exist to create such visuals, Méliès used limited tools and his imagination to create a relatively impressive production."

== Rediscovery ==
The only known copy was bought at a junk shop in the 1930s-40s in Christchurch, New Zealand, but not recognized for what it was until 1985.

== See also ==
- 1896 in film
- List of ghost films
