= Collings (surname) =

Collings is an Old English surname with two possible origins. One is from the Norse name which in Old English became 'Cola', meaning swarthy or dark. The second possibility is that it comes from 'Coll', a diminutive of Nicholas, meaning 'victory of the people'.

Alternative spellings or related surnames include Collin, Colling, Coling, Collins, Colings, Collis, Coliss, Collen, and Collens. For further information, see Collins.

== Notable people with this surname include ==
- Benjamin Collings (born 1977), American politician
- Dave Collings (1901–1982), American college football player
- David Collings (1940–2020), British actor
- Dulcie "Dahl" Collings (1909–1988), Australian designer of Collings Productions
- Geoffrey Collings (1913–1996), British trade unionist
- Geoffrey Collings (1905–2000) Australian film director of Collings Productions
- Francis Collings, presenter of the "Sports News" television segment broadcast on BBC 1, BBC News 24 and BBC World since 1997
- Jesse Collings (1831–1920), mayor of Birmingham, England, a member of Parliament, and an advocate of educational reform and land reform
- Joe Collings (1865–1955), Australian politician
- Keturah Anne Collings (1862–1948), British painter and photographer
- Marie Collings (1791–1853), Dame of Sark from 1852 to 1853
- Matthew Collings (born 1955), British art critic and broadcaster
- Michael R. Collings (born 1947), poet and speculative fiction literature critic, and former
- Rex Collings (1925–1996), first publisher of Watership Down
- Samuel Collings (artist), British artist of 18th century
- Samuel Collings (actor), British actor
- William Frederick Collings (1852–1927), Seigneur of Sark from 1882 to 1927
- William Thomas Collings (1823–1882), Seigneur of Sark from 1853 to 1882
- John Stanhope Collings-Wells (1880–1918), English recipient of the Victoria Cross

Fictional characters

- Harry Collings, a character in the 1971 film The Hired Hand played by Peter Fonda
