= Esmé Collings =

English photographer and miniaturist

- Born: 1859; Weston-Super-Mare, England
- Died: 28 March 1936 (aged 76); Eastbourne, England
- Occupation: Filmmaker

Arthur Albert Collings (1859 – 28 March 1936), known as Esmé Collings, was an English photographer, miniaturist and the first of the loose association of early film pioneers dubbed the Brighton School by French film historian Georges Sadoul. Collings, whose interest in cinematography may have stemmed from his business association with fellow film pioneer William Friese-Greene, was only active in film production for about a year, has left little trace and is, according to film historian Rachael Low, of local importance only.

== Biography ==
An 1896 film by Esmé Collings

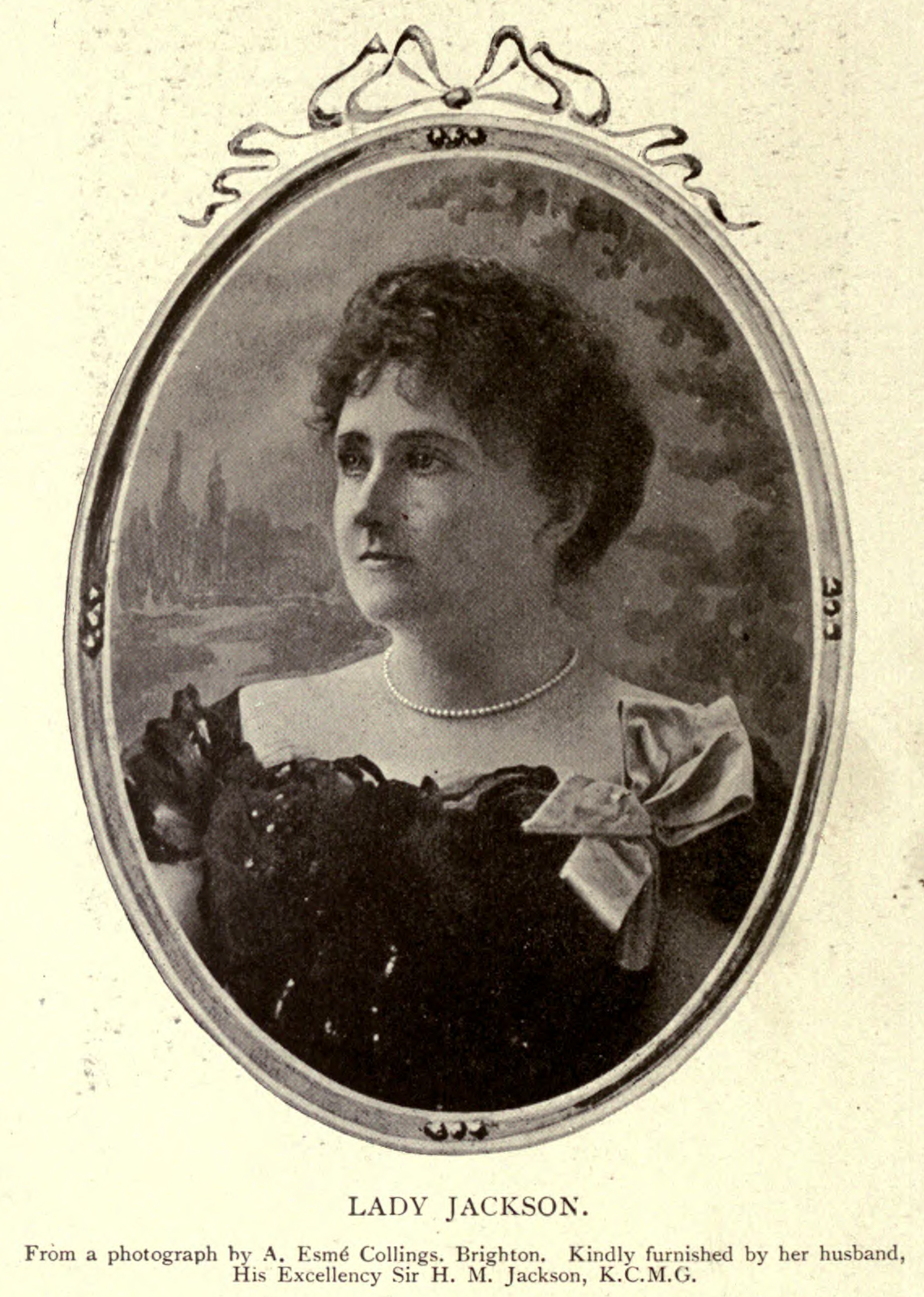
Lady Emily Jackson by Collings

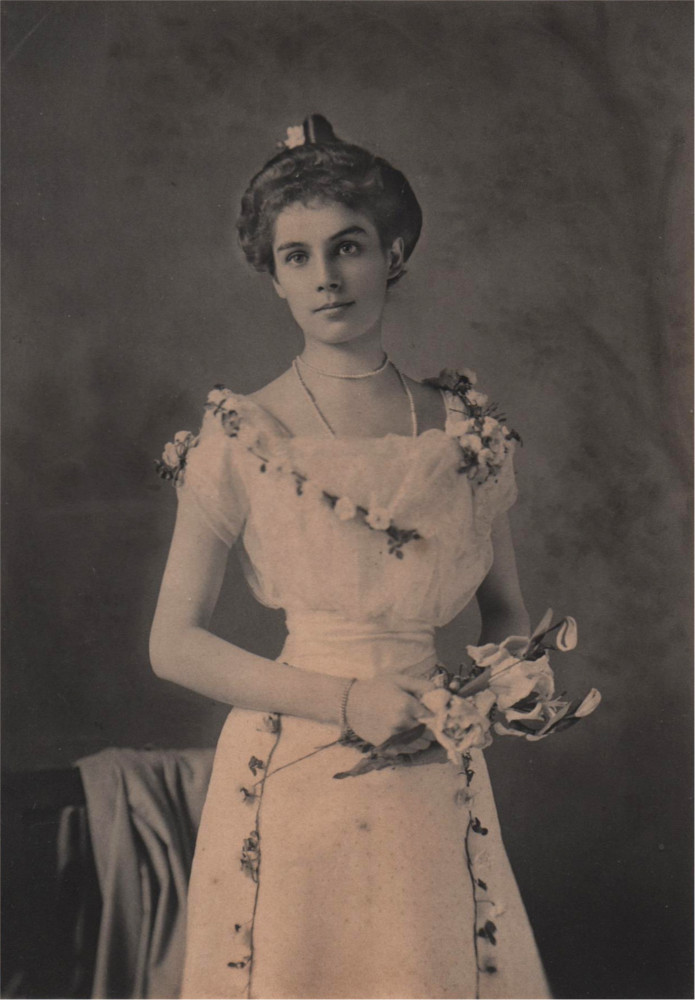
Woman wearing a corset by Collings c. 1900

Collings was born in Weston-Super-Mare, England sometime late in 1859, with his birth registered in the last quarter of that year. The son of local bootmaker James Collings, he followed his father into the trade, before his artistic ambitions were nurtured by Keturah Anne Beedle, whom he married in 1887.

Around 1887, Collings and his brother James went into partnership with film pioneer William Friese-Greene running two London photographic studios at 69 New Bond Street and 92 Piccadilly. The partnership of Friese Greene & Collings opened a third London studio at 100 Westbourne Grove and a branch at 69 Western Road, Hove, the following year. Friese-Greene's lack of professionalism and perceived financial mismanagement of the business had however resulted in Collings' dissolution of the partnership by the end of that year. Collings retained control of the Bond Street and Hove studios initially with his brother as James Whyte Collings & A. Esme Collings Ltd. but from 1890 onward as Arthur Esme Collings Limited.

By the time of the 1891 census, Arthur Collings, who is listed as an Artist Photographer, was residing with his wife at 59 Dyke Road, Brighton, where their son Arthur Cyril Esme Collings was born the following year. Around 1893, Collings transferred his studio to 120 Western Road, Hove which he retained his name until World War I.

By the summer of 1896, Collings had taken up residence at 13 Alexandra Villas, Hove and begun to build a catalogue of films including Railway Scene, featuring a train arriving at The Dyke railway station mimicking the Lumière Brothers' Train Pulling into a Station, A Victorian Lady in Her Boudoir, an early erotic film, and The Broken Melody, featuring Dutch cellist Auguste van Biene. On 18 September Collings sent his camera to local engineer Alfred Darling for repairs; Darling, who also may have supplied the camera to Collings, would go on to manufacture his own film equipment and assist fellow pioneers George Albert Smith and James Williamson in perfecting their apparatus. Collings films were shown on Chard's Vitagraph as part of an eight-week run at Bristol's Empire Palace of Varieties commencing 19 October.

In 1897, Collings filmed three scenes based on the popular song Simon the Cellarer for Lewis Sealy to screen accompanied by live singers. A second run of Collings films on Chard's Vitagraph at Bristol's Empire Palace of Varieties commenced the following year. The following year Collings ceased film production to concentrate on miniature portraiture.

By 1906, he had withdrawn from the photography business; closing a second studio he had opened at 89 King's Road, Hove in 1902 and leaving former army officer Richard Berwick Hope in charge of the Western Road studio, Collings returned to London to focus on his painting. Esme Collings (Hove) Ltd, registered to stock broker Albert Winder Grant and photographers Henry Lawrence and William Leonard Staines in July 1910, closed the Bond Street branch in June 1913 and the Western Road branch sometime after 1915.

On 28 March 1936, Collings died at his home in Eastbourne, Sussex.

== Family ==
Collings' wife Keturah Collings (née Beedle), who initially encouraged him to pursue his artistic ambitions, worked as a photographer and portrait artist in a series of London studios from 1905 until her death in 1948.

== Legacy ==
The pioneering film work of Esmé Collings, as well as James Williamson and George Albert Smith, was commemorated in the 1966 BBC Television programme It Began in Brighton, produced by Melvyn Bragg and directed by Tristram Powell.

== Filmography ==
Date	Title	Credited as				Notes
Date	Title	Cinematographer	Producer	Writer	Director	Notes
1896	Crowd at Law Court aka Crowds in London	Yes	Yes		Yes	Lost actuality.
9 November 1896	Lord Mayor aka The Lord Mayor's Show aka Arrival of the Lord Mayor in London	Yes	Yes		Yes	Lost actuality.
1896	West Street, Brighton aka Street Scene in Brighton	Yes	Yes		Yes	Lost actuality.
October 1896	Rough Sea aka The Hove Sea Wall in a Gale aka Ocean Waves in a Storm	Yes	Yes		Yes	Lost actuality.
August 1896	King's Road, Brighton aka Brighton Front on a Bank Holiday aka Crowds in Brighton	Yes	Yes		Yes	Lost actuality.
August 1896	Boys under Pier aka Boys Scrambling for Pennies under the West Pier, Brighton aka Children Playing in the Sea	Yes	Yes		Yes	Extent actuality.
August 1896	Children Paddling aka Children Paddling and Playing on the Sands aka Children on the Beach	Yes	Yes		Yes	Extent actuality.
August 1896	Dyke Station aka Train arriving at Dyke Station aka Railroad Scene	Yes	Yes		Yes	Lost actuality.
1896	Soldiers Landing aka Soldiers in Portsmouth	Yes	Yes		Yes	Lost actuality.
6 November 1896	Czar in Paris	Yes	Yes		Yes	Lost actuality.
8 November 1896	Czar in Versailles	Yes	Yes		Yes	Lost actuality.
1896	Musical Party, Van Biene	Yes	Yes		Yes	Lost actuality featuring Auguste van Biene.
1896	The Broken Melody aka Theatre Scene	Yes	Yes		Yes	Lost romantic drama featuring Auguste van Biene.
1896	Hose Scene aka Comic Scene	Yes	Yes		Yes	Lost film.
1896	Donkey Rider	Yes	Yes		Yes	Partially extent actuality.
1896	Sailors Gun Drill aka Military Scene	Yes	Yes		Yes	Lost actuality.
1896	Do. Cavalry aka English Cavalry in Aldershot	Yes	Yes		Yes	Lost actuality.
1896	Policeman and Cook aka Love Scene	Yes	Yes		Yes	Lost film.
1896	Bathers on the Beach at Brighton	Yes	Yes		Yes	Extent actuality.
1896	Woman Undressing aka A Victorian Lady in Her Boudoir	Yes	Yes	Yes	Yes	Extent erotic film.
1896	Portsmouth: The Ferry	Yes	Yes		Yes	Lost actuality.
1896	Sailors off an English Warship	Yes	Yes		Yes	Lost actuality.
1896	Bicycle Rider	Yes	Yes		Yes	Lost actuality.
1896	Workers Leaving a Dock	Yes	Yes		Yes	Lost actuality.
1896	Street Traffic in London	Yes	Yes		Yes	Lost actuality.
1896	Road Race in Gatwick	Yes	Yes		Yes	Lost actuality.
1896	London Westminster Bridge	Yes	Yes		Yes	Lost actuality.
1896	Street Scene in Portsmouth	Yes	Yes		Yes	Lost actuality.
