= BBC Sportsday =

- Title card used from 2023 to 2025
- Also known as: Sport Today (BBC World News before 26 June 2023)
- Created by: BBC World News; BBC News
- Presented by: Nick Marshall-McCormack; Chris Mitchell; Marc Edwards; Tulsen Tollett
- Country of origin: United Kingdom
- Original language: English

Production
- Production locations: BBC Television Centre, London (2003–2012); MediaCityUK, Salford (2012–2025)
- Running time: 15–25 minutes

Original release
- Network: BBC News (international feed); BBC News (UK feed); BBC One; BBC Two
- Release: 2001 – 1 August 2025

Related
- Sportsday

BBC Sportsday is a sports news programme produced by the BBC and is shown on BBC News. It is broadcast up to 12 times daily from Monday-Thursday, 11 times daily on Friday and twice daily at the weekend. The programme provides the news, results and action from major sports events around the world.

In the United Kingdom, it was broadcast as the same name of the programme, weekdays at 13:30, 18:30, 22:30 weekends at 13:15, 18:30 and 19:30, following the main news bulletins on BBC One. There was also a shorter bulletin simulcast on BBC Two, and the news channel (both internationally and UK) at 11:45 and on news channel (both internationally and UK) 14:45.

From 13 June 2011, three more bulletins were added to provide more news content for viewers in the UK overnight and in the Asia-Pacific region in the mornings. They are shown as part of the BBC's Newsday, these are simulcast on BBC One, airing at 45 past the hour between 01:45 and 04:45 UK Time.

Until April 2023 it was known as BBC Sport Today. Then on 26 June 2023, it became BBC Sportsday after the BBC News and BBC World News merger.

In March 2025, the BBC announced its intention to cancel Sportsday as part of a reform to its sports coverage. From August 2025, all sport bulletins have been simplified under BBC Sport brand.

== Presenters ==
BBC Television Centre, London (2003–2012)

- Rob Bonnet
- Francis Collings
- Adnan Nawaz
- David Brenner

MediaCityUK, Salford (2012–2025)

- Rebecca Adams
- Mike Bushell
- James Pearce
- Karthi Gnanasegaram
- Ore Oduba
- Reshmin Chowdhury
- Phil Jones
- Damian Johnson
- Jonathan Legard
- Sue Thearle (freelance)
- Lizzie Greenwood-Hughes
- Tulsen Tollett
- Laura McGhie
- Holly Hamilton
- Ben Croucher
- Sarah Mulkerrins (freelance)
- Paul Scott
- Jane Dougall
- Chetan Pathak
- Hugh Ferris
- Mark Benstead
- Olly Foster
- Matt Graveling
- Adam Wild
- Tanya Arnold
- Molly Stephens
