= 17.5 mm film =

Standard film gauge

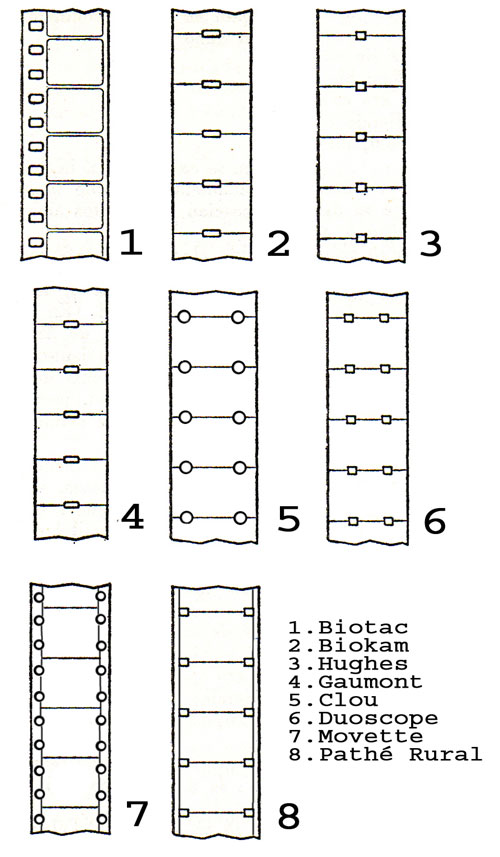
A schema of 17.5 mm movie film formats

17.5 mm film was a film gauge for as many of eight types of motion picture film stock, generally created by splitting unperforated 35 mm film.

== History ==
17.5 mm film was first documented in 1898 with the creation of the Birtac camera, and subsequently went through several different iterations up until the end of World War II, when Kodak's 16 mm film and 8 mm film largely took its place in terms of popularity. In addition to original pioneering experiments, 17.5 mm film was used during World War II to use existing 35 mm stock more economically. Afterward, this format continued to be used primarily in developing countries such as India, or for projects where usage of regular 35 mm film would have been too expensive.

== Partial list ==
=== Birtac ===
The British-American photographer and inventor Birt Acres split 35 mm film in half for his Birtac camera-projector in 1898. The film used had a single row of perforations running down the left side of the image, with two perforations per image. Historically, this is considered to be the first piece of motion picture equipment that utilized 17.5 film.

=== Biokam ===
Alfred Wrench and Alfred Darling created second 17.5 mm format film in 1899 in London. The only differences between their and Acres' film was that their film had central perforations, and it could be utilized as a medium for still pictures as well. The Biokam camera, projector, and printer (all in one machine) was produced by the Warwick Trading Company.

=== Kinematograph ===
Fridolin Kretzschmar had in 1902 devised and sold his 17.5mm Kinematograph camera intended for the low end of the professional market.

=== Kino ===
In 1903 Heinrich Ernemann introduced its first movie camera, the Kino, aimed at the amateur market. Roepke considers it is evidence of Ernemann's aggressive business acumen that, in seeing a larger amateur market for the device, he produced models nearly identical to Kretzschmar's, either through cooperation with the latter, or by purchasing the patients and forcing his rival out of business. The pocket-sized, 800 gram, Kino 17.5mm used unperforated 35mm film sliced lengthwise with sprocket holes that ran down the centre. It could be processed with a reversal development kit that Ernemann also provided, and the camera doubled as a projector when a lamp housing was attached. Nevertheless, though Ernemann was marketing the ingeniously compact device to amateurs and the home-movie hobbyists, purchasers had to be wealthy to afford it. In addition, he encouraged those who took it up to contribute their films to a catalogue of prints to which he added professional movies, and also Kretzschmar's, which could be purchased for home theatres. Later Ernemann and his son Alexander (1878–1956) produced educational and scientific films, for which Heinrich was awarded his honorary doctorate in 1924.
