= Adolf Miethe =

German photochemist, photographer, pioneer in color photography (1862–1927)

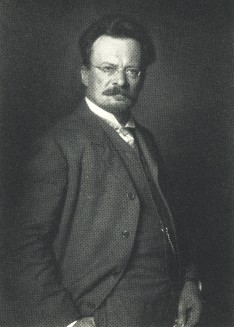
Adolf Miethe around 1905, photographed by Nicola Perscheid.

Adolf Miethe (German: [ˈmiːtə]; 25 April 1862, Potsdam – 5 May 1927, Berlin) was a German scientist, lens designer, photochemist, photographer, author and educator. He co-invented the first practical photographic flash and made important contributions to the progress of practical color photography.

== Early life ==
Adolf Miethe grew up in a middle-class family. His father was a chocolate manufacturer and city councillor in Potsdam. After studying physics, chemistry and astronomy in Berlin, he moved to Göttingen, where in 1889 he received his doctorate for a thesis on the actinometry of photographic astronomic fixed star exposures.

== Career ==
In 1887 he co-invented (with Johannes Gaedicke) the photographic magnesium powder flash-light. After earning his doctorate, he worked for Edmund Hartnack's optical workshop in Potsdam designing microscope objectives. In 1891, after the death of Hartnack, he moved to Rathenow and took a job with the optical company Schulze & Barthels, where he developed telescopes, binoculars, and one of the first tele lenses for cameras. In 1894 he went to Voigtländer & Sohn in Braunschweig, where he held the post of technical director and also worked on improving rifle scopes. In 1899 he succeeded Hermann Wilhelm Vogel at Technische Hochschule Berlin (today Technische Universität Berlin) as professor of photography, photochemistry, and spectral analysis.

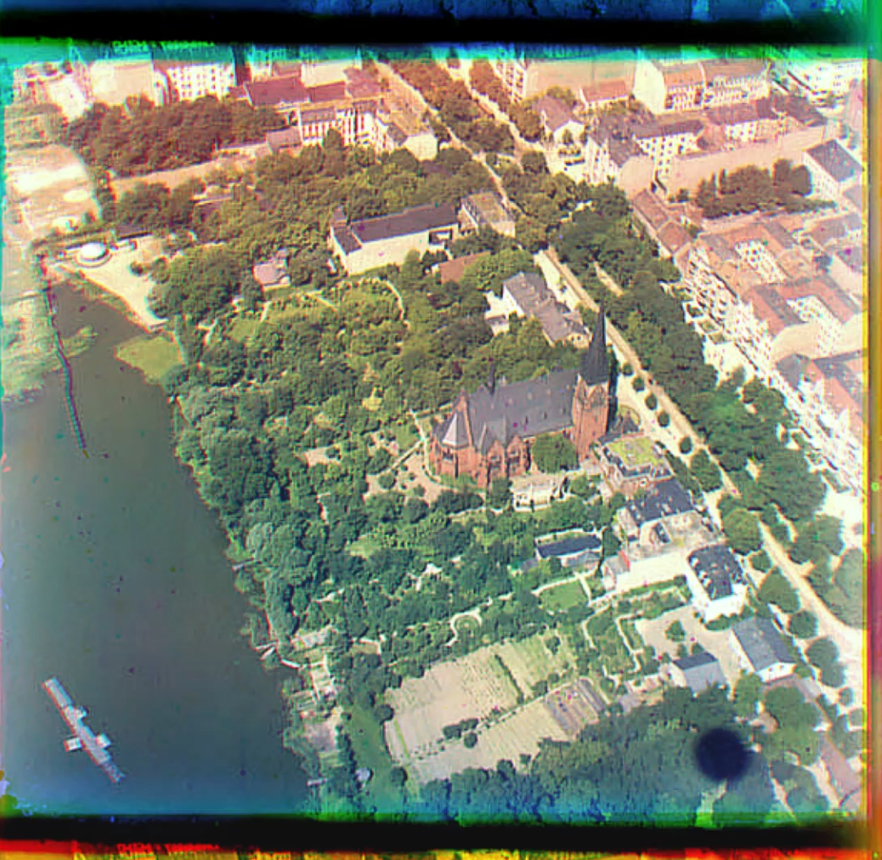
Aerial color photograph of Berlin-Wilmersdorf, taken by Adolf Miethe from a hot air balloon around 1903-6.

Miethe was the designer of a camera for color photography, the first photographic product made by the Berlin cabinetmaker Wilhelm Bermpohl. Introduced to the public in 1903, it produced sets of three separate black-and-white images on glass plates by making a series of three photographs of the subject through red, green and blue color filters, a method of color photography first proposed by James Clerk Maxwell. These were used to reconstitute the full original range of color by projecting transparent positives made from them through similar filters and exactly superimposing the images on the projection screen (additive color), or by making three prints consisting of transparent pigment or dye images in the complementary colors and superimposing those to make a single full-color transparency or print on paper (subtractive color). They were also used to prepare printing plates for illustrating books, periodicals and other mechanically printed media, the only form in which early color photographs were likely to be seen by the general public.

There were a number of technical issues with the system, including the relatively long time required to make each sequence of three exposures and the difficulty of correctly balancing them to obtain accurate color values under different lighting conditions. In 1901, Miethe had introduced "Ethyl Red", a sensitizing dye that greatly improved the characteristics of panchromatically sensitized photographic emulsions, which in turn obviated the very long exposures previously needed to photograph red-filtered images, simplified color filter design, and generally cleared the path for future progress. Miethe's innovations provided the technological foundation used by such photographic pioneers as the Russian Sergey Prokudin-Gorsky, who studied with Miethe for several weeks in 1902.

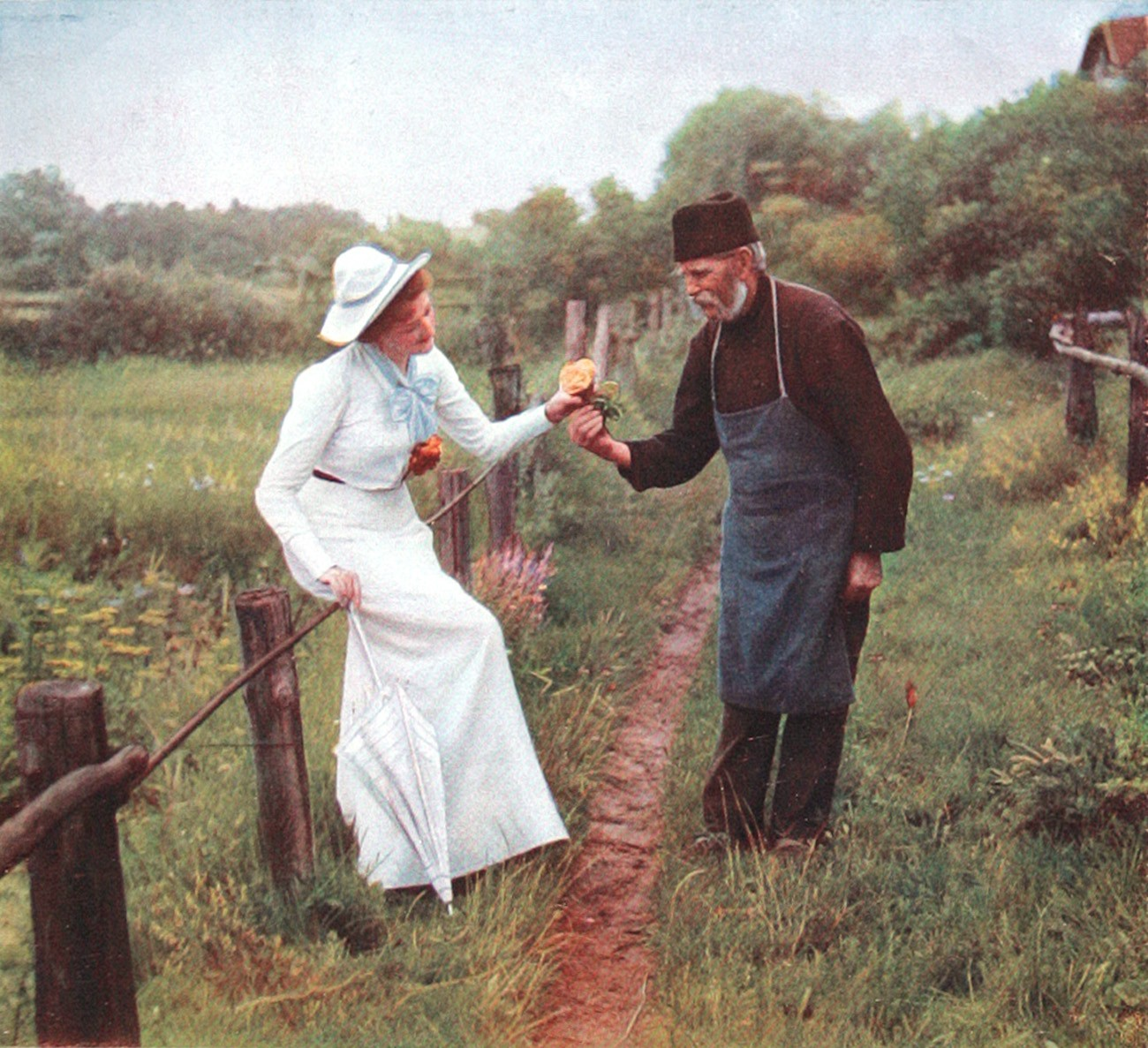
A 1902 color photograph by Miethe, as reproduced photomechanically in Photographische Rundschau in 1903

Miethe served with Heinrich Ernemann, C. P. Goerz, Hugo Erfurth, Dr. Richard Neuhauss, and others on the board of the 1907 first International Photographic Exhibition, held in Dresden, 'a collective representation of Photography in all its branches and in all civilised countries.' In 1909, Miethe began working with an observatory for astrophotography. This interest led him to participate in several overseas expeditions, such as one in 1908 to Upper Egypt to examine twilight phenomena and the ultraviolet end of the solar spectrum. In 1910 he took part in a shipborne expedition to Spitsbergen led by Count Ferdinand von Zeppelin that focused primarily on meteorological issues but also considered the viability of exploring the polar regions by airship. In 1914, he led an expedition to Norway to observe the 21 August solar eclipse.

In 1921, he set up a research institute for cinema technology for which he served as chairman of the board of trustees.

Miethe wrote several books and close to a hundred articles on photography. He took over the editorship of Photographischen Wochenblattes (Photographic Week) in 1889, and in 1894 he founded the magazines Atelier des Photographen (Photographer's Studio) and Photographische Chronik (Photographic Chronicle).

Miethe died in Berlin in 1927 from the lingering after-effects of an injury suffered in a train accident a year and a half earlier.
