= Hugo Erfurth =

German photographer (1874–1948)

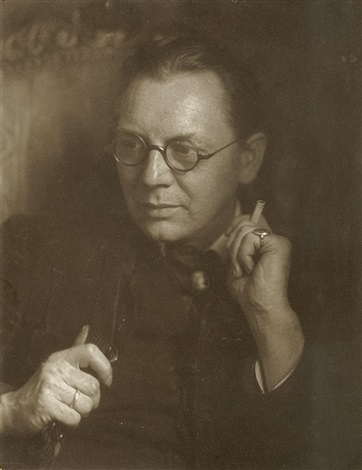
- Self-portrait, c. 1915
- Born: Wilhelm Berthold Hugo Erfurth; 14 October 1874; Halle, Germany
- Died: 14 February 1948 (aged 73); Gaienhofen, Germany
- Education: Dresden Academy of Fine Arts
- Known for: Photography
- Movement: Pictorialism

Hugo Erfurth (14 October 1874 – 14 February 1948) was a German photographer known for his portraits of celebrities and cultural figures of the early twentieth century.

== Life ==
=== Early years ===
Erfurth was born in Halle (Saale), in what was then the German Empire. He grew up on his parents’ farm in Schönau and visited a parish school in Niederschonal in 1883.

By 1884, Erfurth was at school in Dresden. From 1892 to 1896, he studied painting at the Dresden Academy of Fine Arts. In 1894, while still at school, he studied photography through an apprenticeship with court photographer Wilhelm Höffer. Two years later, at the age of 22, he took over the studio of J. S. Schröder at Johannstadt, Dresden.

Erfurth’s early surviving works show a commitment to the style of Pictorialism. He made landscapes and portraits in gum bichromate or as oil pigment prints, and started to earn a reputation as a skilled photographer.

=== Rise to prominence ===
During the next ten years Erfurth ran the Schröder studio, then established his own studio, art gallery, and home in the Palais Lüttichau. He became a member of the German Werkbund and was appointed an honorary member of the London's Royal Photographic Society and of Munich's Süddeutsche Photographen-Verein. Erfurth served with Heinrich Ernemann, C. P. Goerz, Dr. Adolf Miethe, Dr. Richard Neuhauss, and others on the board of first International Photographic Exhibition, held in Dresden, 'a collective representation of Photography in all its branches and in all civilised countries.'

Erfurth married Helene Reuther in 1898 and fathered three children over the next 6 years. He photographed for the Royal Playhouse in Dresden from 1913 to 1919. During this time, Dresden was home to a cultural elite that included Otto Dix, Erich Heckel, Paul Klee, and Oskar Kokoschka. These artists and writers, who considered Erfurth their creative equal, frequented his studio to have their portraits taken. He also photographed opera and dance performers, did work in industrial photography, and experimented with photograms and photomontage.

In 1922, Erfurth opened a gallery under the name "Graphisches Kabinett Hugo Erfurth" with an exhibition of works by Oskar Kokoschka. In 1925, works by Emil Nolde were shown and the exhibition "7 Bauhaus Masters" was organized, with works by Paul Klee and Wassily Kandinsky, among others. The gallery also supported young Dresden artists such as Hans Grundig, Wilhelm Lachnit, and Kurt Schütze.

By the late 1920s, Erfurth had established himself as one of Germany’s leading portraitists and was known for a broad range of work around photography:

...he was the subject of an extensive critical literature and even of a 1927 film that showed him planning, executing, and printing a portrait commission. Possessing strong organizational skills, Erfurth curated a major photography exhibition in Dresden as early as 1904, and he later operated an art gallery in his studio, presenting prints and drawings by the most talented younger German artists. Erfurth also published art criticism, writing for example about the Scottish photographer David Octavius Hill (1802–1870), whom Erfurth admired for suppressing unnecessary detail in his portraits.

In 1919, Erfurth co-founded the exhibiting group Gesellschaft Deutscher Lichtbildner, which included leading German art photographers. He played an important role in this group, chairing the jury from 1924 until 1948.

=== Later years ===
In 1934, Erfurth moved from Dresden to Cologne, establishing a studio there. Though many of his friends and portrait subjects left Germany after Hitler’s rise to power in 1933, Erfurth stayed. His studio and his photo archives were largely destroyed by bombing in 1943. His portraits survived, having been deposited in a safe.

After the war, in 1946, he moved to Lake Constance in Gaienhofen, where he continued to work. A year later, he was given a large retrospective in nearby Switzerland. He died in Gaienhofen the following year at the age of 73.

== Impact ==
The city of Leverkusen and the local company Agfa, which is known mainly for the production of photographic films, sponsored an international prize for photography which bears his name.

== Gallery ==
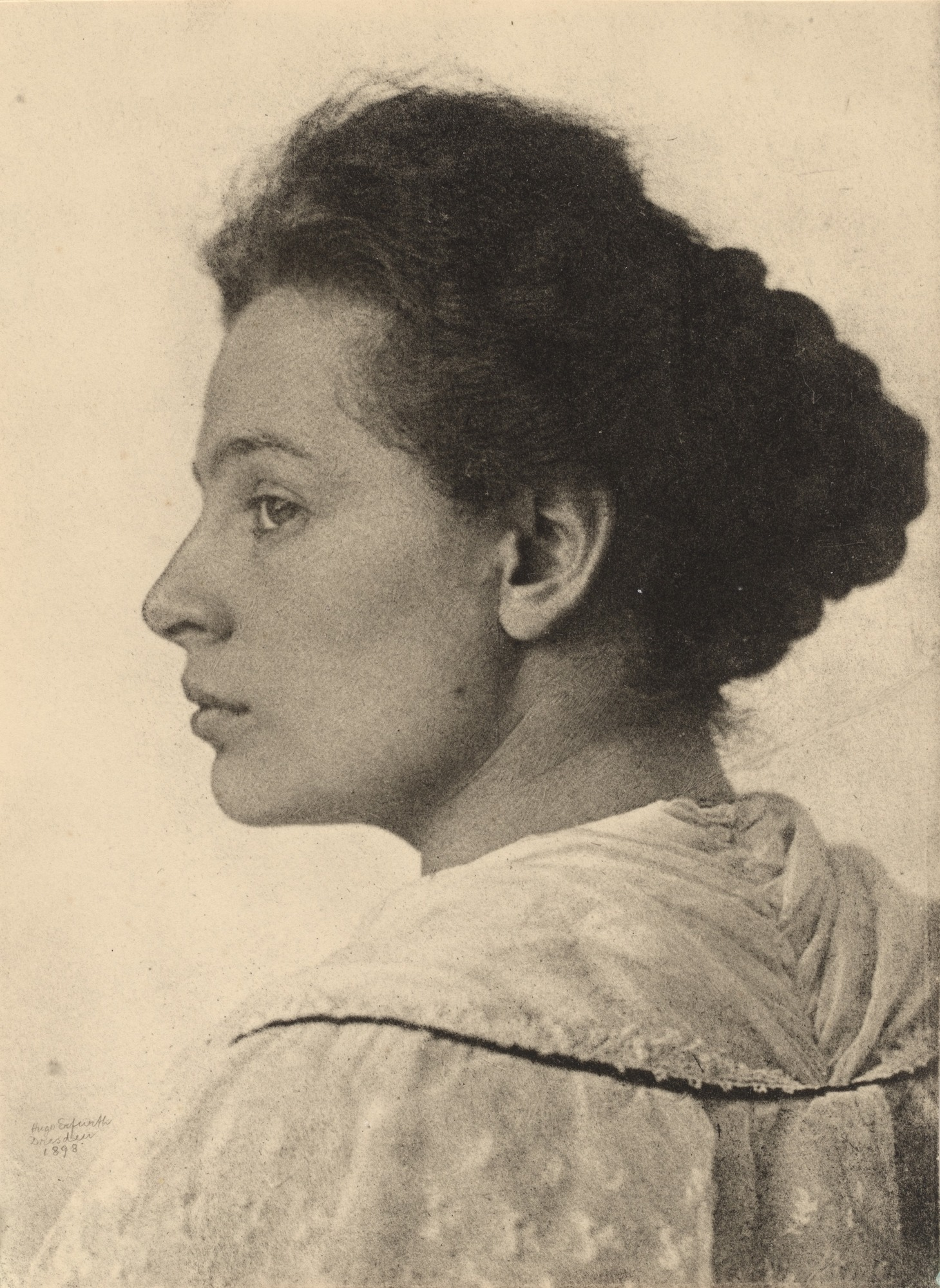
Young Girl (1898), a 1919 oil pigment print

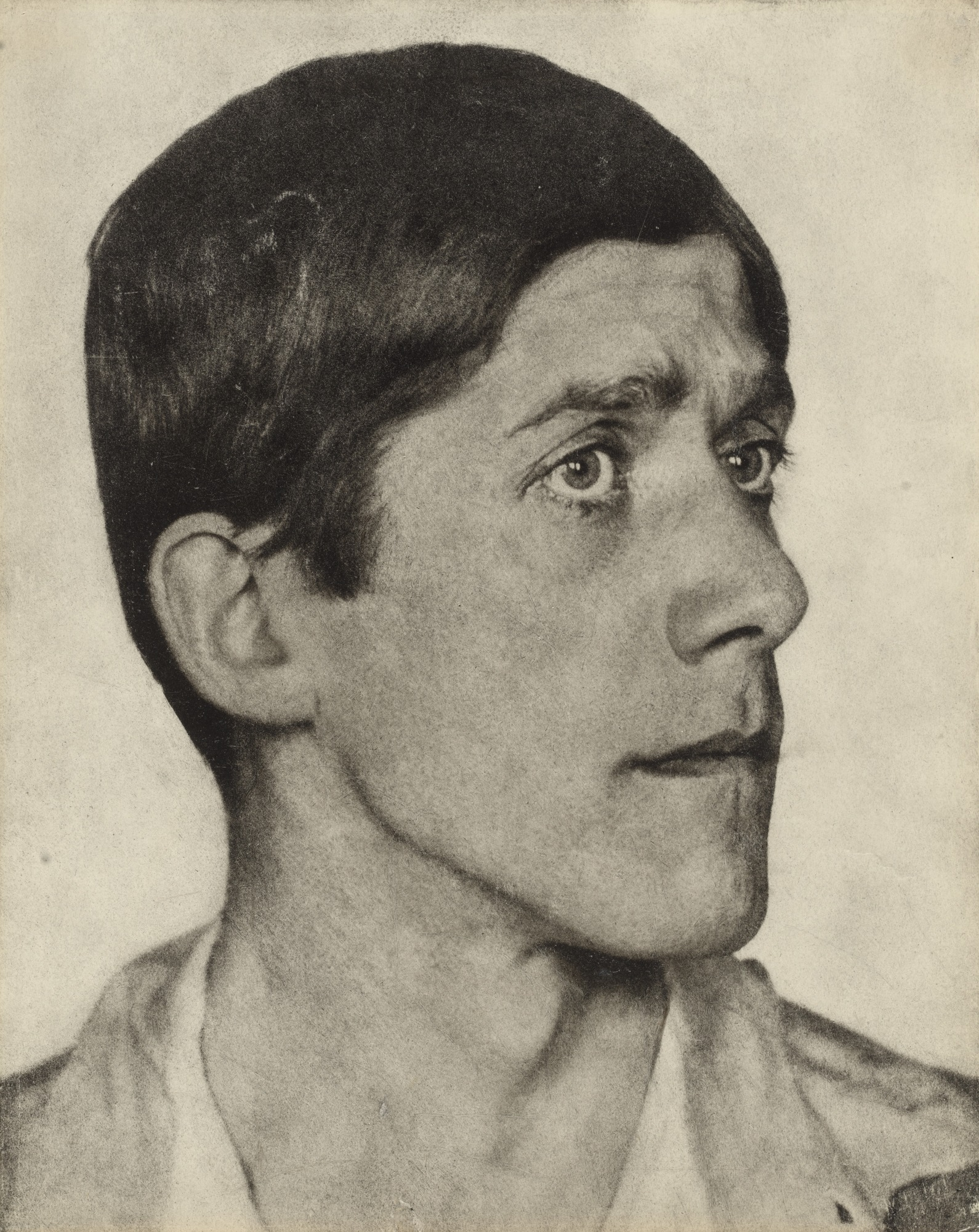
Portrait of Oskar Kokoschka from 1919

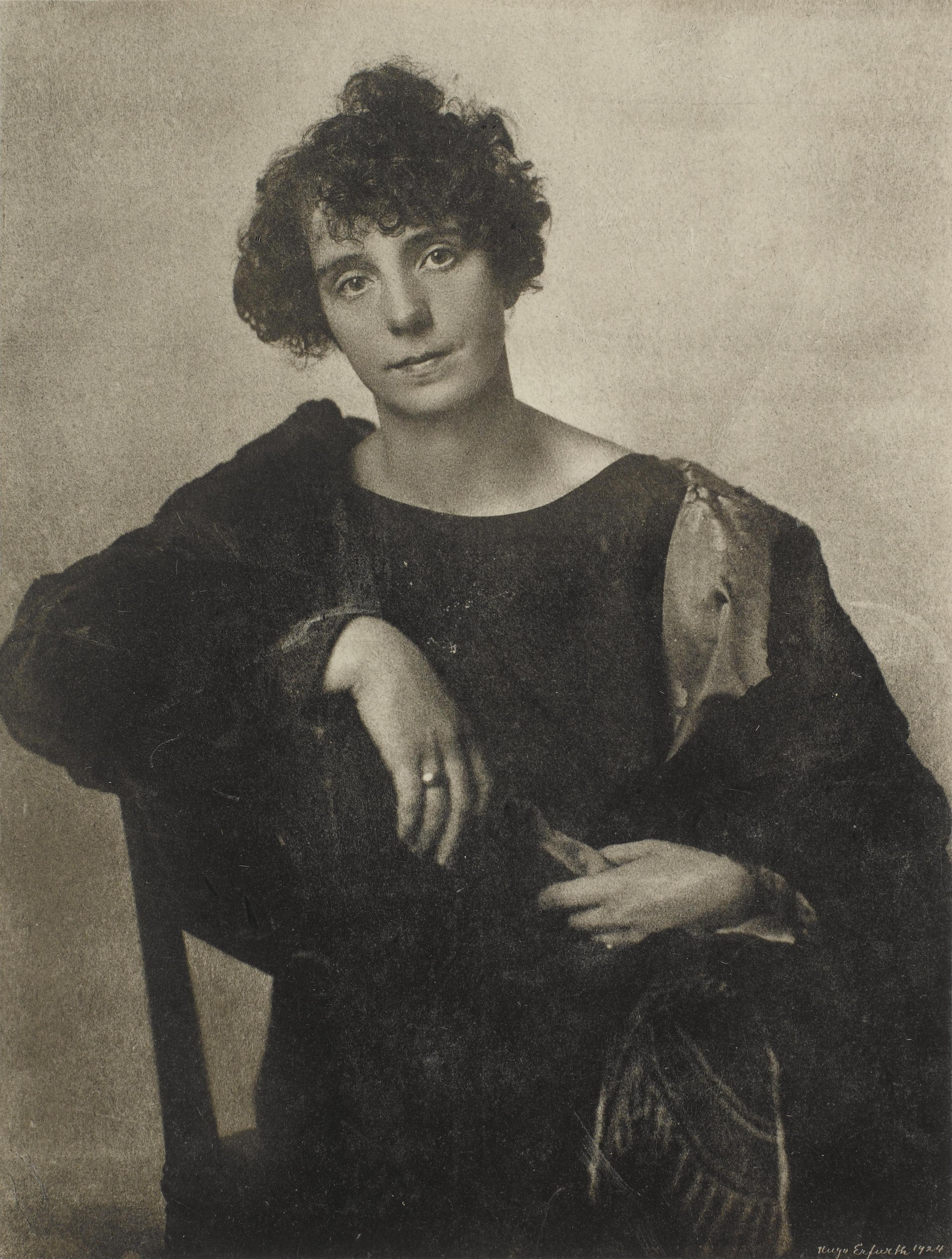
Portrait of Nina Kandinsky from 1924

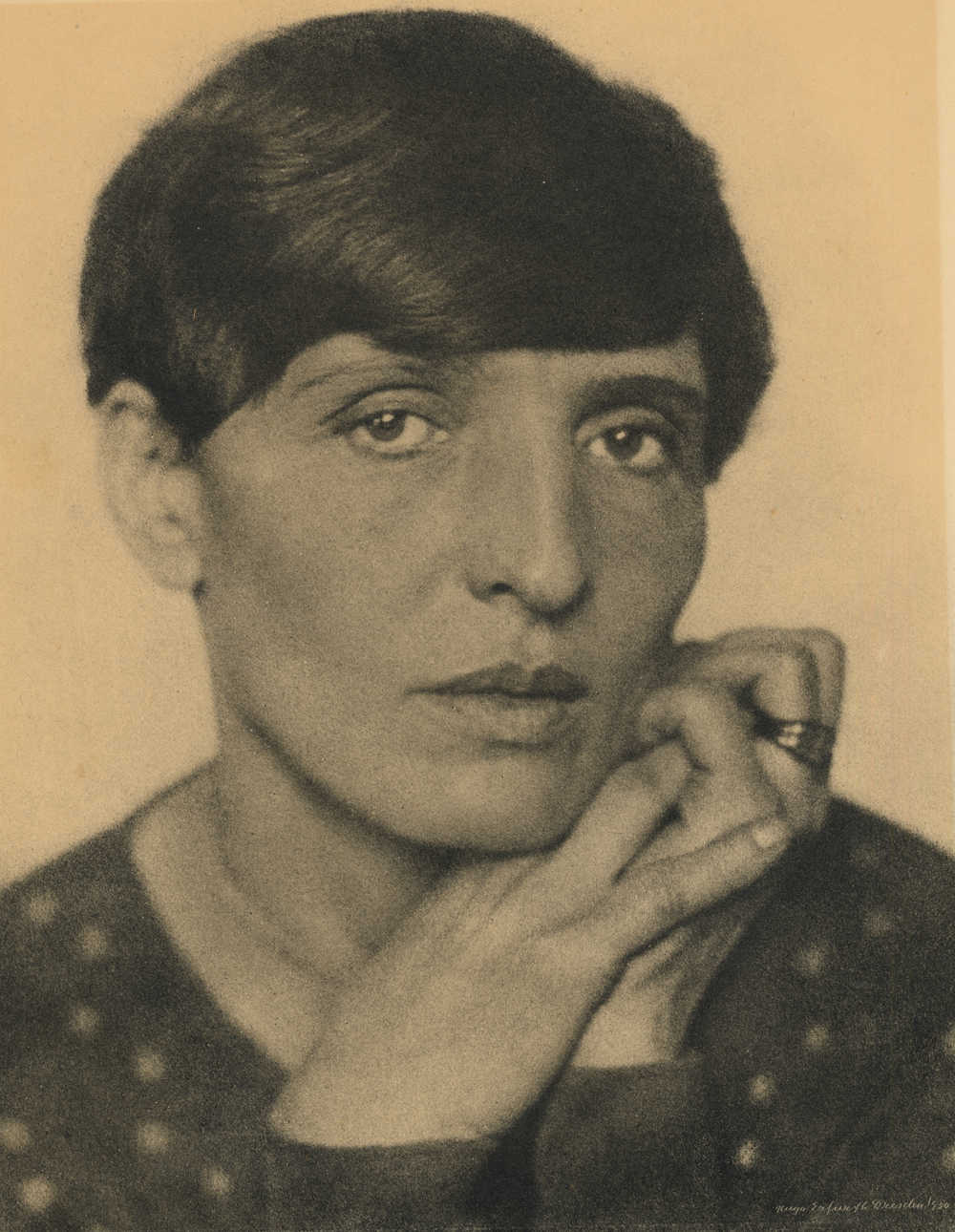
Portrait of German sculptor Renée Sintenis, Dresden, 1930

== See also ==
- Pictorialism
- Portrait photography
