= Alfred Darling =

Alfred Darling (1862–1931) was an engineer. He was also a key member of the loose association of early film pioneers dubbed the Brighton School by French film historian Georges Sadoul.

== Biography ==
Darling began to manufacture film equipment at his engineering works at 25 Ditchling Rise, Brighton after carrying out repairs for Esmé Collings. His clients included George Albert Smith and James Williamson. In 1897 he took out a patent, jointly with Alfred Wrench, for a camera with a variable shutter and a claw pull-down mechanism. In 1899, on a commission from Charles Urban, he produced the Biokam, a film-making system for amateurs using 17.5mm film. His 35mm film equipment was widely used during the early years of cinema development.
