= Erich Salomon =

German photojournalist (1886–1944)

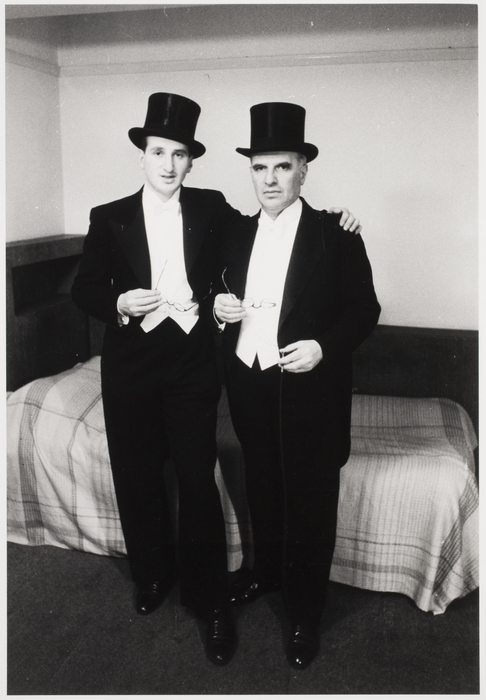
- Erich Salomon (right) and his son Otto Salomon (Peter Hunter) (left), London 1935
- Born: April 28, 1886; Berlin, Germany
- Died: July 7, 1944; Auschwitz concentration camp
- Occupation: News photographer
- Known for: Pioneering candid photography in diplomacy and law

Erich Salomon (28 April 1886 – 7 July 1944) was a German news photographer known for his pictures in the diplomatic and legal professions and the innovative methods he used to acquire them.

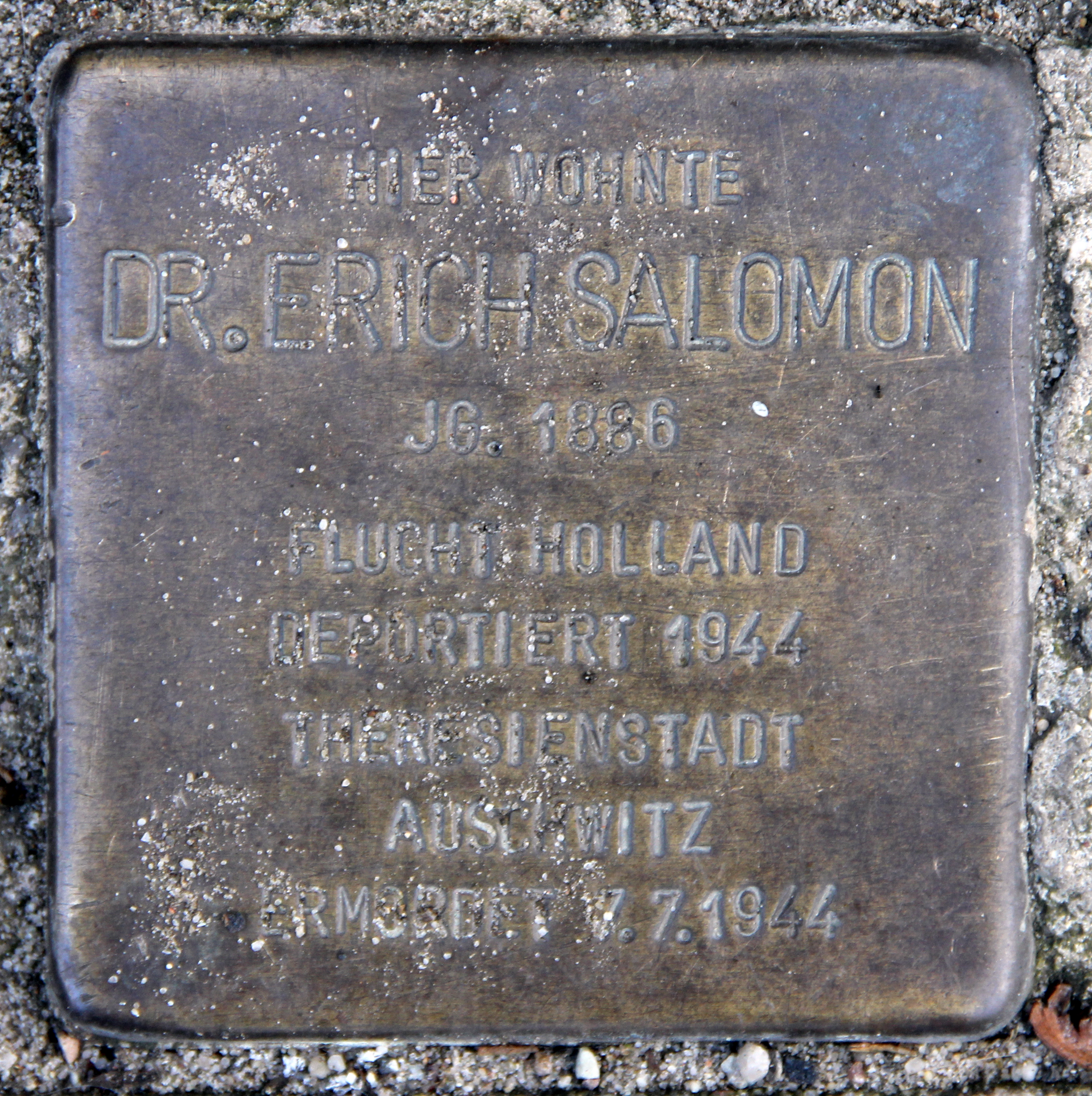
Stolperstein (stepping stone): HIER WOHNTE; DR. ERICH SALOMON; JG. 1886; FLUCHT HOLLAND; DEPORTIERT 1944; THERESIENSTADT; AUSCHWITZ; ERMORDET 7.7.1944

== Life and work ==
He was born in Berlin as the son of the wealthy Jewish banker and Royal Councillor of Commerce Emil Salomon (1844–1909) and Therese Salomon née Schüler (1857–1915). The upper-class Berlin family lived at Jägerstraße 29 and later at Tiergartenstraße 15 (today the State Representation of Baden-Württemberg is located here). Salomon studied law, engineering, and zoology up to World War I. He served on the Western Front and was captured by the French in 1914. After the war, he worked in the promotion department of the Ullstein publishing empire designing their billboard advertisements. He first picked up a camera in 1927, when he was 41, to document some legal disputes and soon after hid an Ermanox camera usable in dim light in his bowler hat. By cutting a hole in the hat for the lens, Salomon snapped a photo of a police killer on trial in a Berlin criminal court.

Beginning in 1928, Salomon worked for Ullstein's Berliner Illustrirte Zeitung as a photographer. With his multilingual ability and clever concealment, his reputation soared among the people of Europe. When the Kellogg-Briand Pact was signed in 1928, Salomon walked into the signing room and took the vacant seat of the Polish delegate, and took several photos.

Salomon photographed the passage to Ellis Island, the route that was frequently traveled by migrants to the United States as Ellis Island at the time was a detention and immigration centre. Salomon is one of only two known persons to have photographed a session of the U.S. Supreme Court.

After Adolf Hitler came to power in Nazi Germany, Salomon fled to the Netherlands with his wife and continued his photographic career in The Hague. Salomon declined an invitation from Life magazine to move to the United States. He and his family were trapped in the Low Countries after Germany invaded in 1940. Salomon and his family were held in the Westerbork transit camp, then for almost five months in Theresienstadt concentration camp and were deported from there to the Theresienstadt family camp in May 1944. He and his wife were murdered in Auschwitz on 7 July 1944.

The Dr. Erich Salomon Award is a lifetime achievement award for photojournalists given by the German society for photography.

In 1978 Salomon was inducted into the International Photography Hall of Fame and Museum.

== Photos by Salomon ==
- Summit Conference (1928; depicts foreign ministers of France, Germany, Britain, Poland, Japan, and Italy just before they signed the Kellogg-Briand Pact)
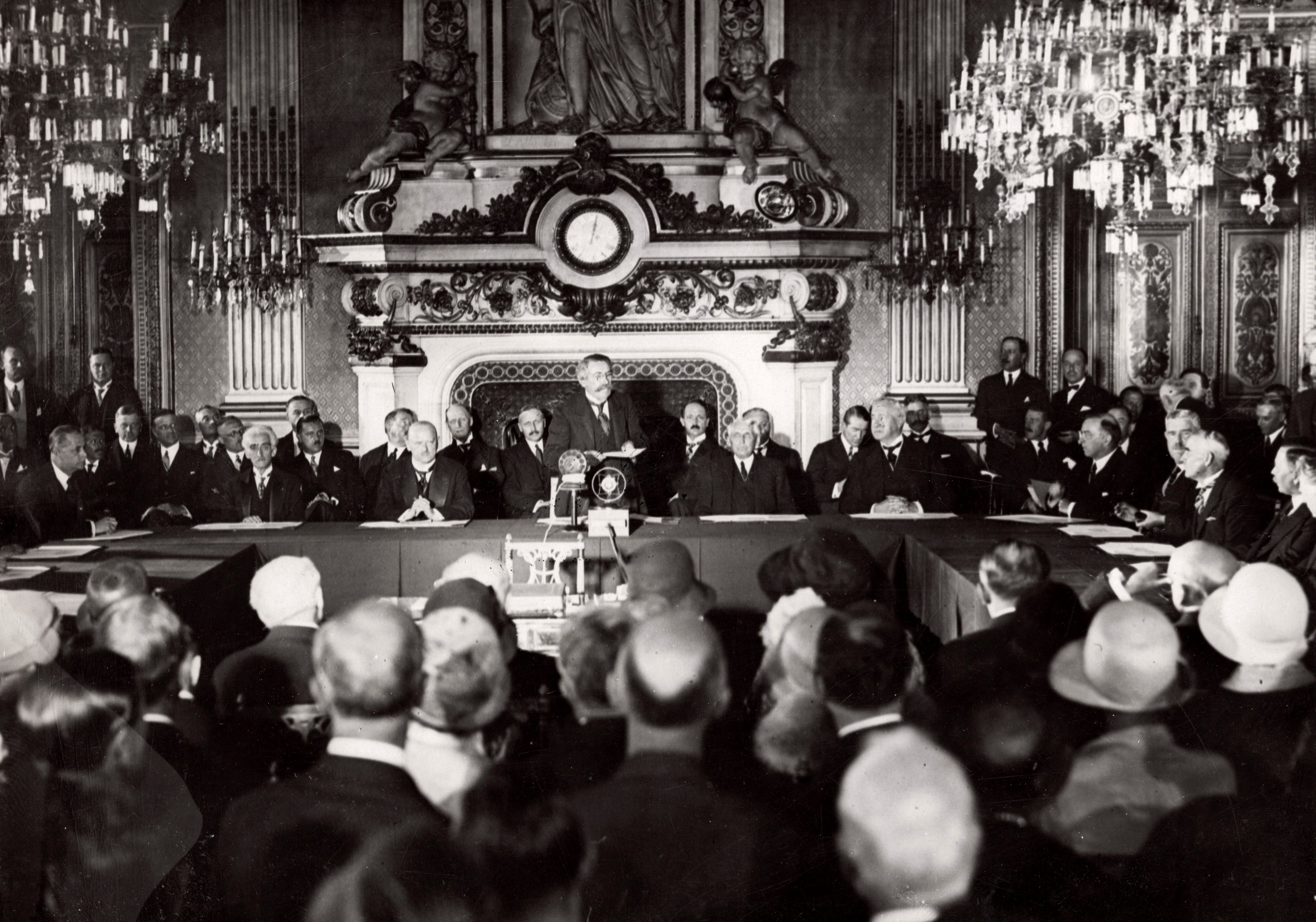
Kellogg–Briand Pact (1928)

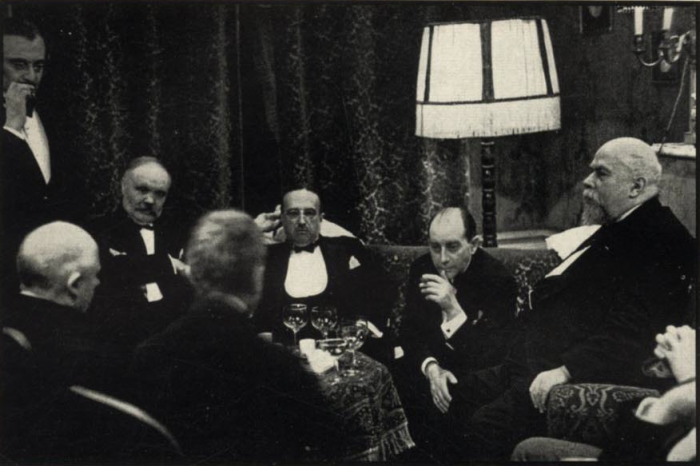
Hague Reparation Conference (1930)

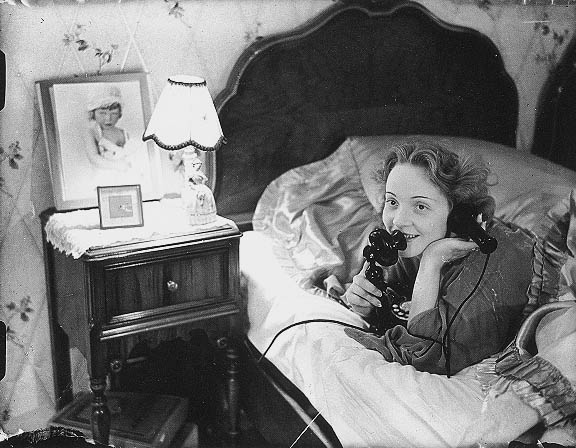
Marlene Dietrich (1930)

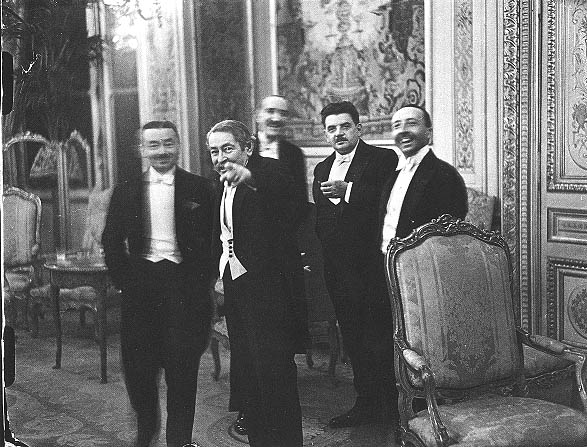
Aristide Briand (1931)

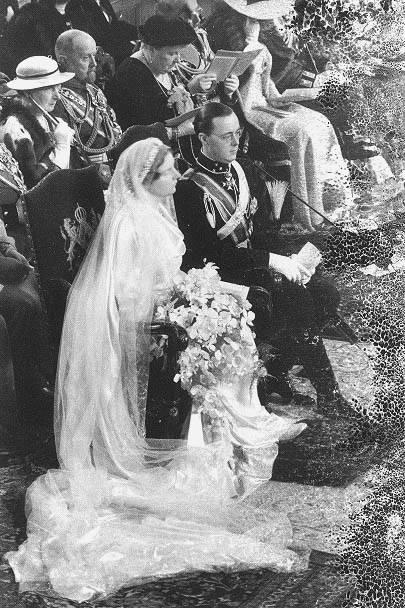
Wedding of Juliana of the Netherlands (1937)

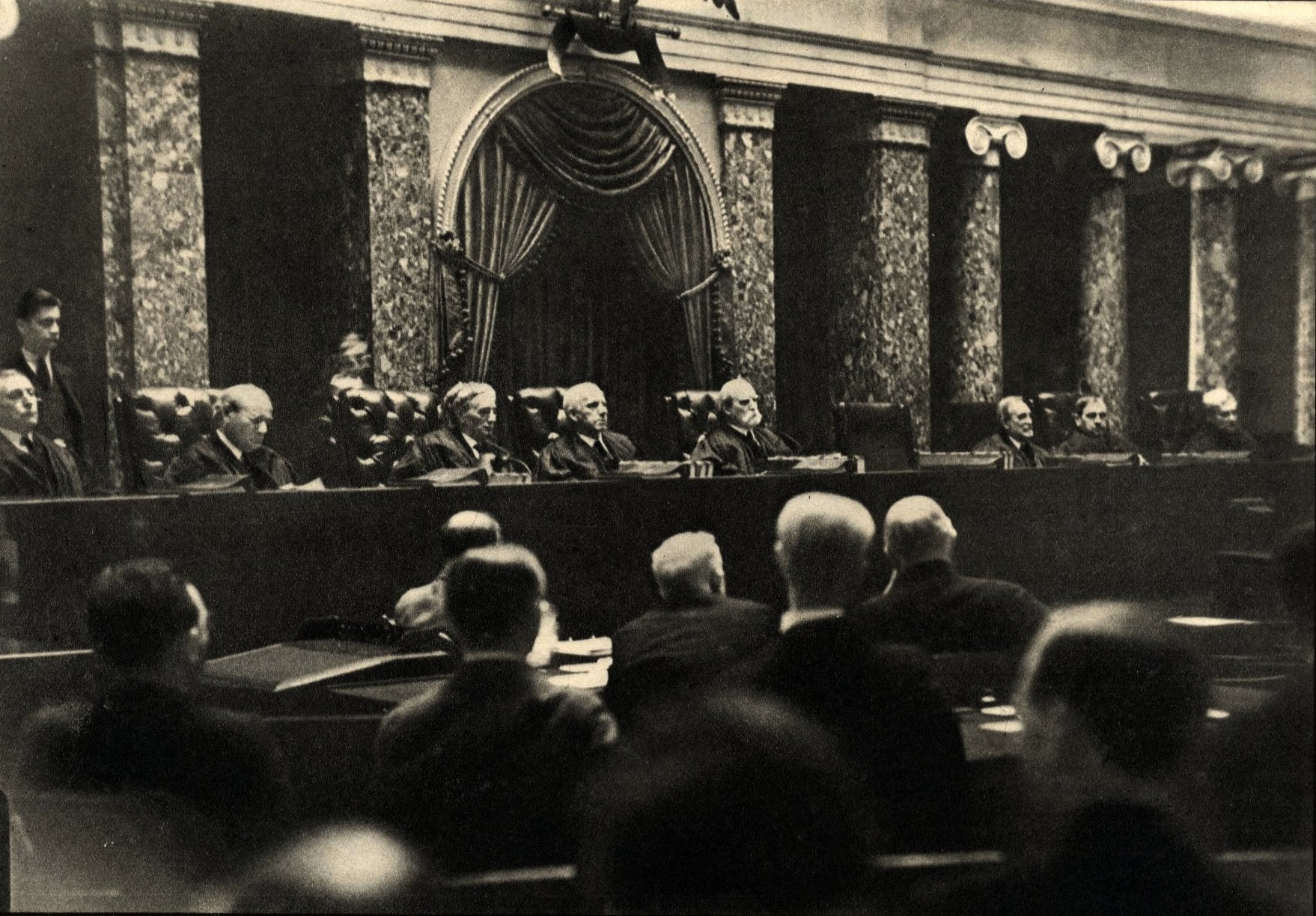
U.S. Supreme Court (1932)
