= Heinrich Ernemann =

German inventor, entrepreneur and industrialist (1850–1928)

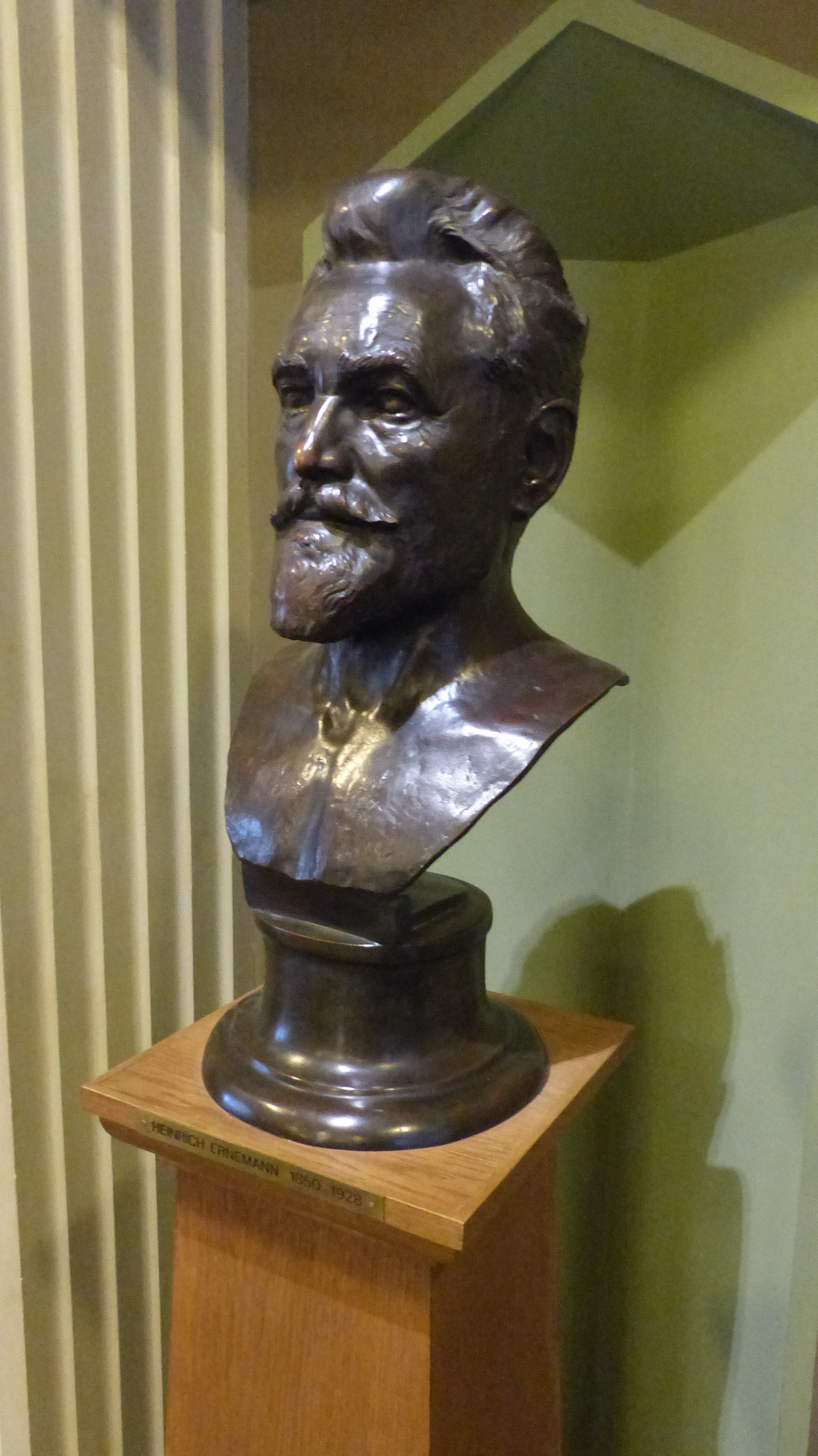
- Bust of Heinrich Ernemann
- Born: 28 May 1850; Gernrode
- Died: 16 May 1928 (aged 77); Hartha
- Other names: Johann
- Occupations: entrepreneur, inventor, industrialist
- Years active: 1866–1928
- Known for: Ernemann-Werke AG, Dresden
- Notable work: photographic equipment
- Board member of: Zeiss-Ikon AG
- Spouse: Marie Therese Grafe
- Awards: Order of Albrecht (First Class) honorary doctorate, Technical University of Dresden

Johann Heinrich Ernemann (28 May 1850, Gernrode, Eichsfeld – 16 May 1928, Hartha), son of Catharina Ernemann and Joseph Brodmann, farmer, was a German inventor, entrepreneur and industrialist who contributed innovations in photography and cinema equipment, and was founder of Ernemann-Werke AG.

== Entrepreneur ==
Born into a poor farming family, Heinrich Ernemann was educated in Gernrode only to the primary level. Leaving Eichsfeld in 1866, he worked at the Krupp Gussstahlfabrik in Essen until about 1870. Exempted from military service, he studied in the business school in Pirna before working as a commercial traveller. He moved to Dresden and on New Year's Eve of 1875 married Marie Therese (née Grafe) with whom he turned his mother-in-law's haberdashery store into a thriving business. Living frugally, by 1888 they had saved 7,500 marks with which Ernemann purchased a share in carpenter Wilhelm Franz Matthias's camera shop on Pirnaer Strasse in Eschdorf, establishing himself in the still-nascent photo industry. Recognising and developing the market for such goods, he gave their small backyard workshop the brand 'Dresden photographic apparatus factory,' producing bespoke portable and studio cameras. In January 1891, Matthias departed, unhappy with Ernemann's industrialisation.

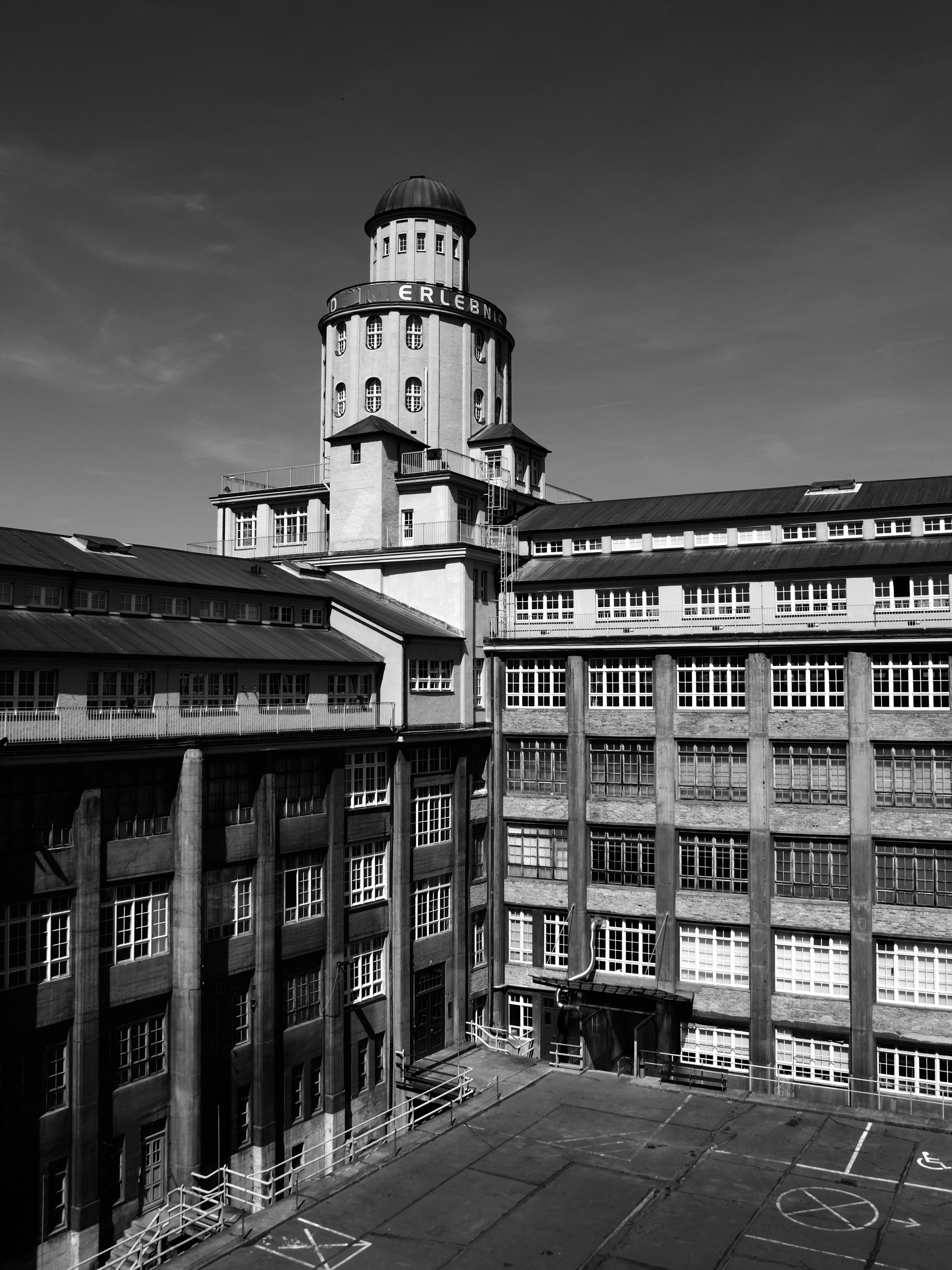
Technische Sammlungen Dresden, Ernemann-Turm

== Industrialist ==
Moving into larger premises in 1892 Ernemann then introduced steam power, contriving an operating structure necessary for industrial mass production and machinists to reduce dependence on suppliers for small metal parts. By May 1892 the company was granted its first patent, for a between-the-lens shutter, and published its first catalogue in 1896. Their 'Edison Universal' magazine camera of 1894 was the first to be stamped with the Ernemann name in an era when it was the retailers who branded the product.

In a visionary manner he thus expanded the company so that it became one of the most important photo and cinema companies in the German empire. Awards were received at prestigious trade shows, including the Great Trade and Art Exhibition in Dresden in 1896 confirming Ernemann, beside Emil Wünsche and Richard Hüttig, as one of the Saxon entrepreneurs in the photography industry whose businesses expanded, while others who did not industrialise were bankrupted or taken over; in 1909 even Wünsche and Hüttig were forced to merge as ICA (International Camera Aktiengesellschaft). The Berliner Borsen Zeitung reported in March 1899 that 'with the cooperation of the H. G. Lueder bank' Heinrich Ernemann's enterprise had been entered in the commercial register as a stock company under the name: 'Heinrich Ernemann Actiengesellschaft für Camera-Fabrikation Dresden', 'with a registered capital of 650,000 ℳ.' To protect his intellectual property Ernemann registered the trademark Lichtgöttin ('Goddess of Light'), used on the company's equipment productions until 1920, after which it was used only for their chemical products.

Meanwhile, in 1903 Ernemann introduced its first movie camera, the Kino, aimed at the amateur market. Entrepreneur and inventor Fridolin Kretzschmar had in 1902, prior to Ernemann, devised and sold his 17.5mm Kinematograph camera intended for the low end of the professional market. Roepke considers it is evidence of Ernemann's aggressive business acumen that, in seeing a larger amateur market for the device, he produced models nearly identical to Kretzschmar's, either through cooperation with the latter, or by purchasing the patients and forcing his rival out of business. The pocket-sized, 800 gram, Kino 17.5mm used unperforated 35mm film sliced lengthwise with sprocket holes that ran down the centre. It could be processed with a reversal development kit that Ernemann also provided, and the camera doubled as a projector when a lamp housing was attached. Nevertheless, though Ernemann was marketing the ingeniously compact device to amateurs and the home-movie hobbyists, purchasers had to be wealthy to afford it. In addition, he encouraged those who took it up to contribute their films to a catalogue of prints to which he added professional movies, and also Kretzschmar's, which could be purchased for home theatres. Later Ernemann and his son Alexander (1878–1956) produced educational and scientific films, for which Heinrich was awarded his honorary doctorate in 1924.

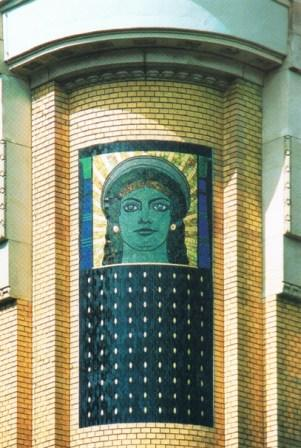
'Lichtgöttin' mosaic at the Ernemann factory, Dresden

In 1897, Ernemann built a new factory in the same street as the ICA factory, Schandauer Straße in Dresden, a city which thus became a centre for the photography industry. By 1923 his factory incorporated the landmark Ernemann Tower which still stands, rebuilt after a fire which destroyed it in 1923.

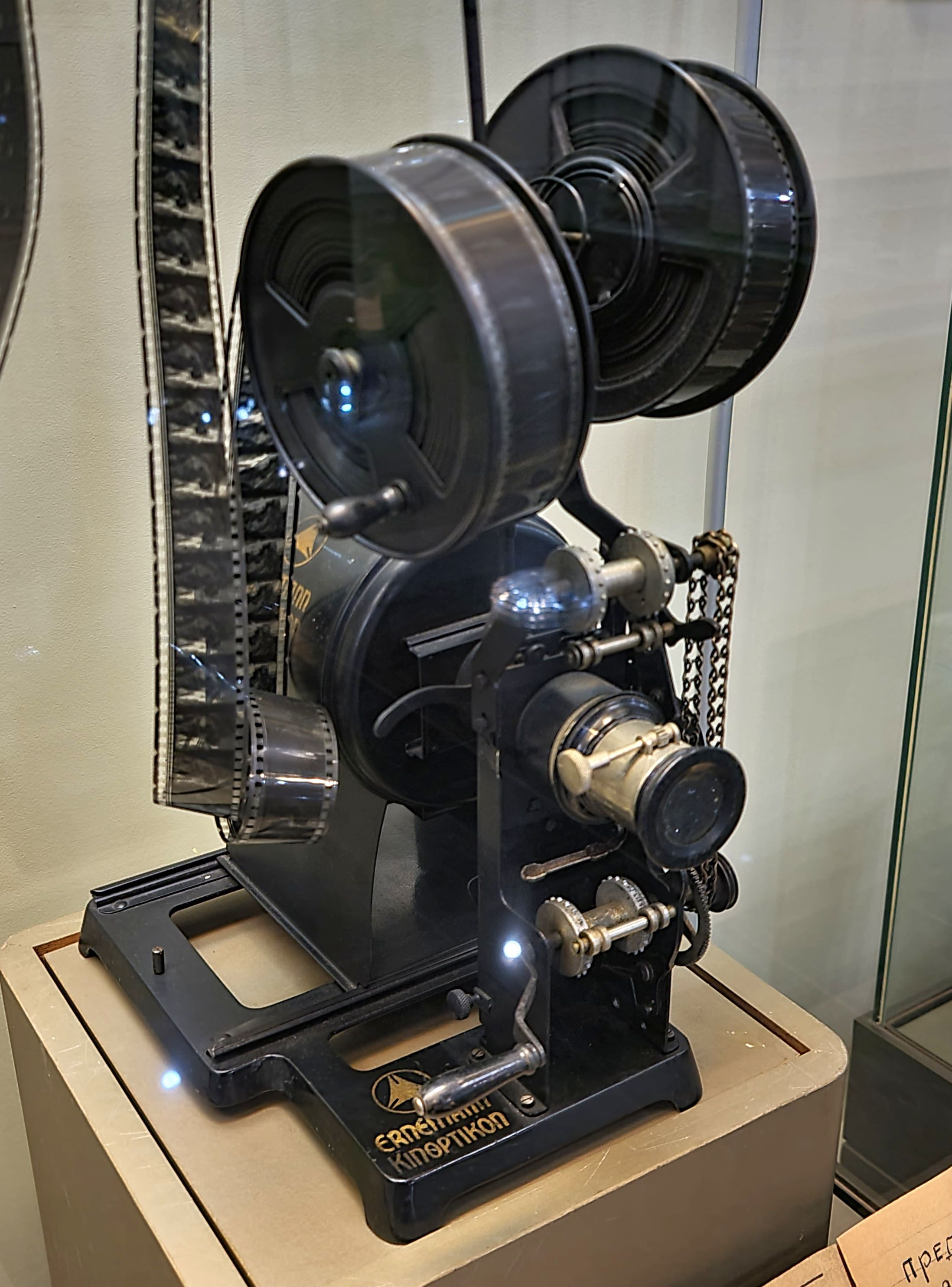
Imperator 35mm movie projector

His son Alexander, who in America had become expert in industrial efficiency, joined the company as technical manager in 1904 and restructured it, introducing quality control and a system of apprenticeships.

The company developed an international market. The German science, trade and industry magazine Prometheus, in a 1905 article about aerial photography from tethered balloons and kites, notes their recent use during the Russo-Japanese War when the Russian Topographical Institute in St. Petersburg had the Heinrich Ernemann Camera Manufacturing Company build special equipment for automatic balloon photographs in the East Asian theatre of war. These consisted of seven photographic cameras, one of which photographed directly downwards, while the other six were arranged in a circle around it and inclined with their axes at 30° to the horizontal and an angle of 60° between each other, so that at a height of 300 m above the ground, the entire terrain up to the horizon was photographed.

From 1907 the company ground its own lenses from Jena glass, and released a single-lens reflex and a 360º panoramic camera, the Rundblick. Their Imperator, a durable 35mm movie projector made from steel, an engineering advance on flimsy and unreliable existing models, was launched at the first International Photographic Exhibition, 'a collective representation of Photography in all its branches and in all civilised countries,' held in Dresden (on the board which, Ernemann served with Hugo Erfurth, C. P. Goerz, Dr. Adolf Miethe, Dr. Richard Neuhauss, and others) and was quickly taken up by almost all cinemas in Paris. At a 1911 trade fair the Ernemann company received the highest award for the projector, recording devices and amateur movie cameras.

== World War I ==
Increasing expenditure on its 400 employees, plant and advertising caused financial strain but a mooted merger with ICA was avoided and after the company recovered quickly in 1910, Ernemann was knighted in the Order of Albrecht (First Class). In 1913 Frederick Augustus III, the King of Saxony, conferred upon him the title of Kön Kommerzienrat (Royal Counselor of Commerce) for Saxony. Before America declared war on Germany, the company had opened retail premises at 114 Fifth Avenue, New York City. The Photographische Chronik und Allgemeine Photographen-Zeitung of 1913 considered that:

It is a pleasing sign of the development of the Ernemann-A.-G. and the popularity of its products that the company has already been able to undertake its third large expansion building since its foundation in 1899 without having to increase its share capital, since the expansions carried out could always be covered from current funds in addition to the payment of a satisfactory dividend.

Likewise, during World War I, which halved its workforce, military purchases quickly restored the company's wealth and its employee numbers. Ernemann's prestige and influence continued to grow, so that in 1913 he was appointed to the Royal Saxon Commercial Council in the year that his new employee Dr. Hans Lehmann prototyped the Zeitlupen, an early slow-motion camera eventually capable of 1500 frames-per-second, as proven in demonstrations for the Dresden Scientific Society; and an aerial camera of critical value in the War.

== Post-war ==
The end of the War confronted Ernemann with new financial difficulties that were remedied by cooperation with Friedrich Krupp AG to make and sell projectors; replacement of the Lichtgöttin logo by a Maltese cross gear symbol over the three Krupp rings; the licensing to manufacture J. P. Hansen's Norka studio camera; and the opening of a new chemical factory in leased, and in 1923, purchased, facilities in nearby Bannewitz.

The 1922/23 period of hyperinflation, during which the company produced for the government the 50 million Deutschmarks voucher, was followed by recovery and expansion of the Schandauer buildings to accommodate the then 3,500 workers, then a recession that halved that number.

== The Ermanox ==
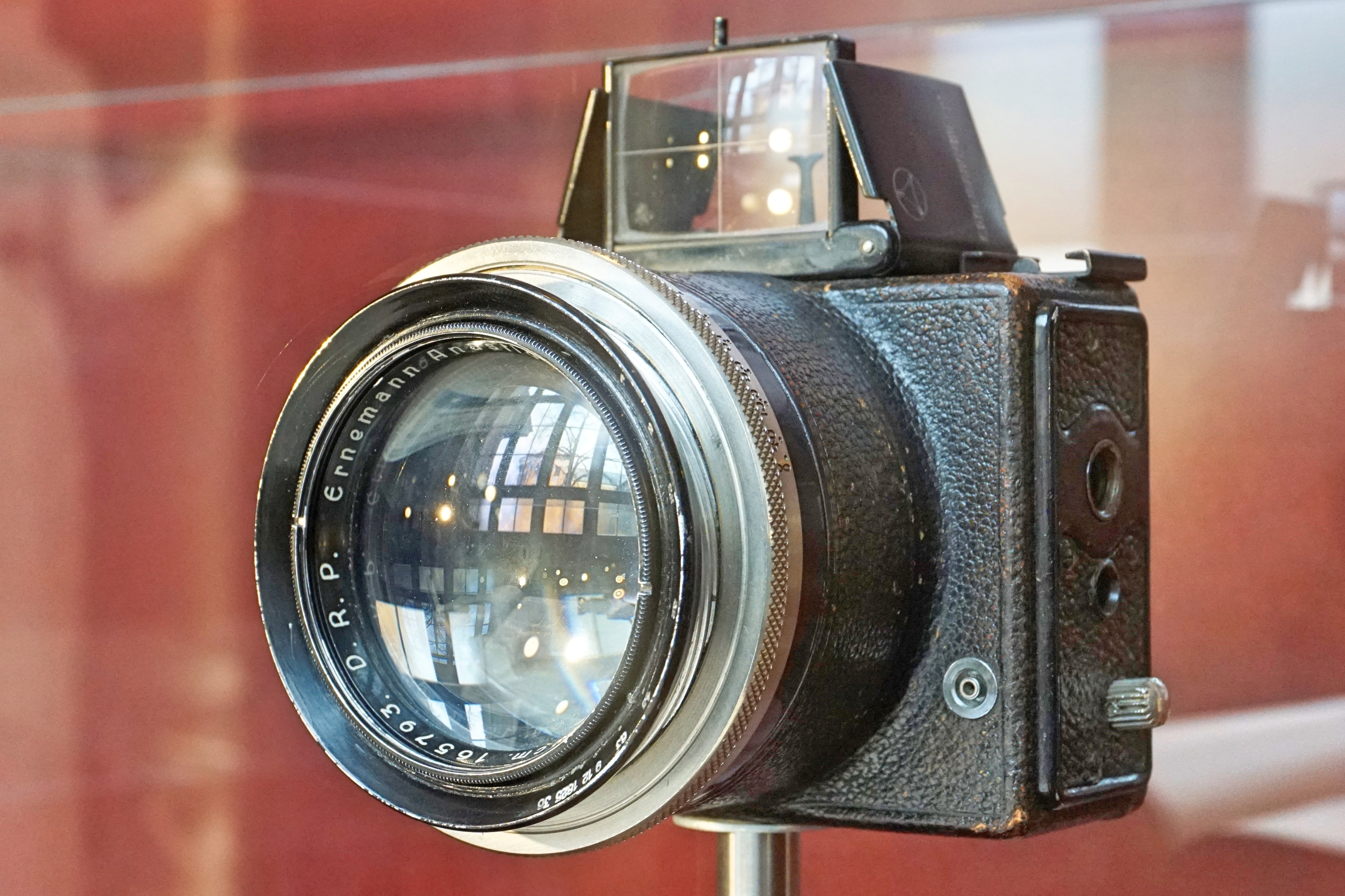
Ermanox camera 1925

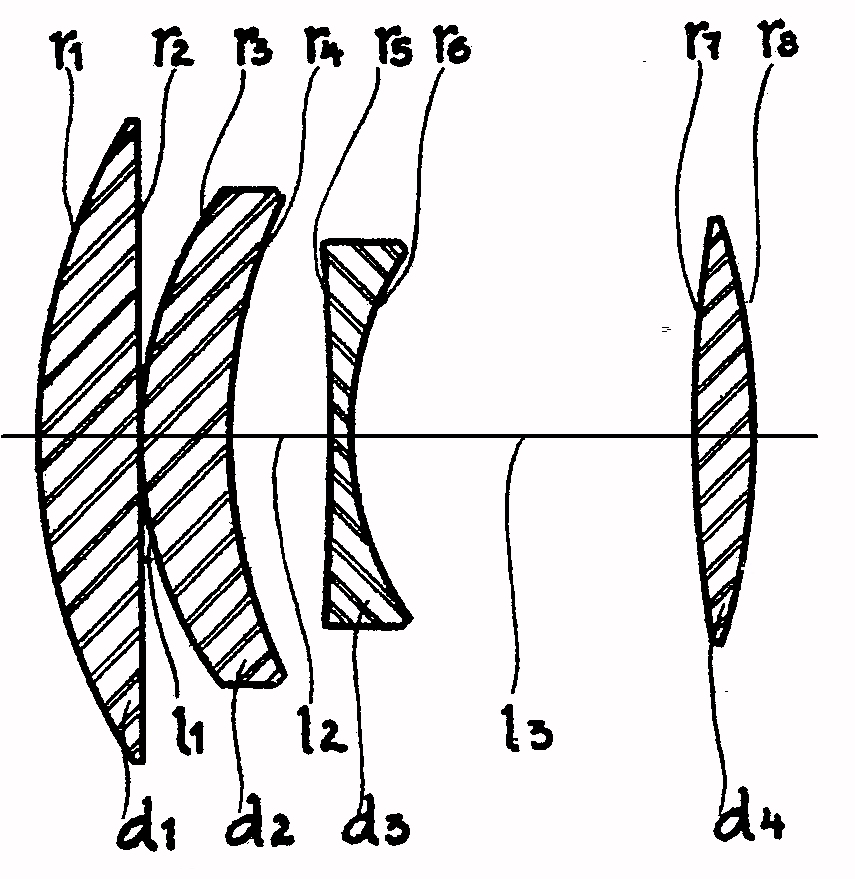
Ernostar 105mm ƒ1,8 (1924 design)

Company employee since 1919, and only twenty-three, the self-taught optical engineer Ludwig Bertele designed, under the supervision of August Klughardt, the ƒ2.0/125mm the Ernostar design for a 'miniature' press camera, the Ermanox (Latin: nox, meaning night, darkness). A triplet lens into which he introduced an extra positive meniscus element, its advantage to low-light photojournalism, such as the famously and surreptitiously made by Erich Salomon of politicians, was due to its increased light-gathering power while reducing the aberrations that the wide aperture would otherwise introduce. In 1920 he widened the aperture to a then remarkable ƒ1.8, though Gernsheim notes that as the depth of field on its 4.5x6 cm plates was rendered so extremely shallow at that aperture, many press photographers preferred the ƒ2.0.

== Merger ==
Max Bruenner, writing on the Dresden industry in the American photo magazine Photo-Era in 1923 remarked:

What reader has not heard of the firm of Ernemann, which sends its products to all parts of the world? As in many other branches, the German camera-industry owes its development to the creative ability of individuals who have performed in their special field untiring pioneer-work. Such a man, in Dresden, is Heinrich Ernemann.

In 1926, Ernemann-Werke AG merged with Carl Zeiss, the Optical Institution C. P. Goerz, the International Camera Actiengesellschaft (ICA) and the Contessa-Nettel, as Zeiss-Ikon AG, for which Bertele continued innovations in lenses including the Sonnar series based on the Ernostar, and a wide-angle lens, the Biogon.

While the Dresden family business came to an end after 37 years, Heinrich Ernemann remained on the board of the new company.

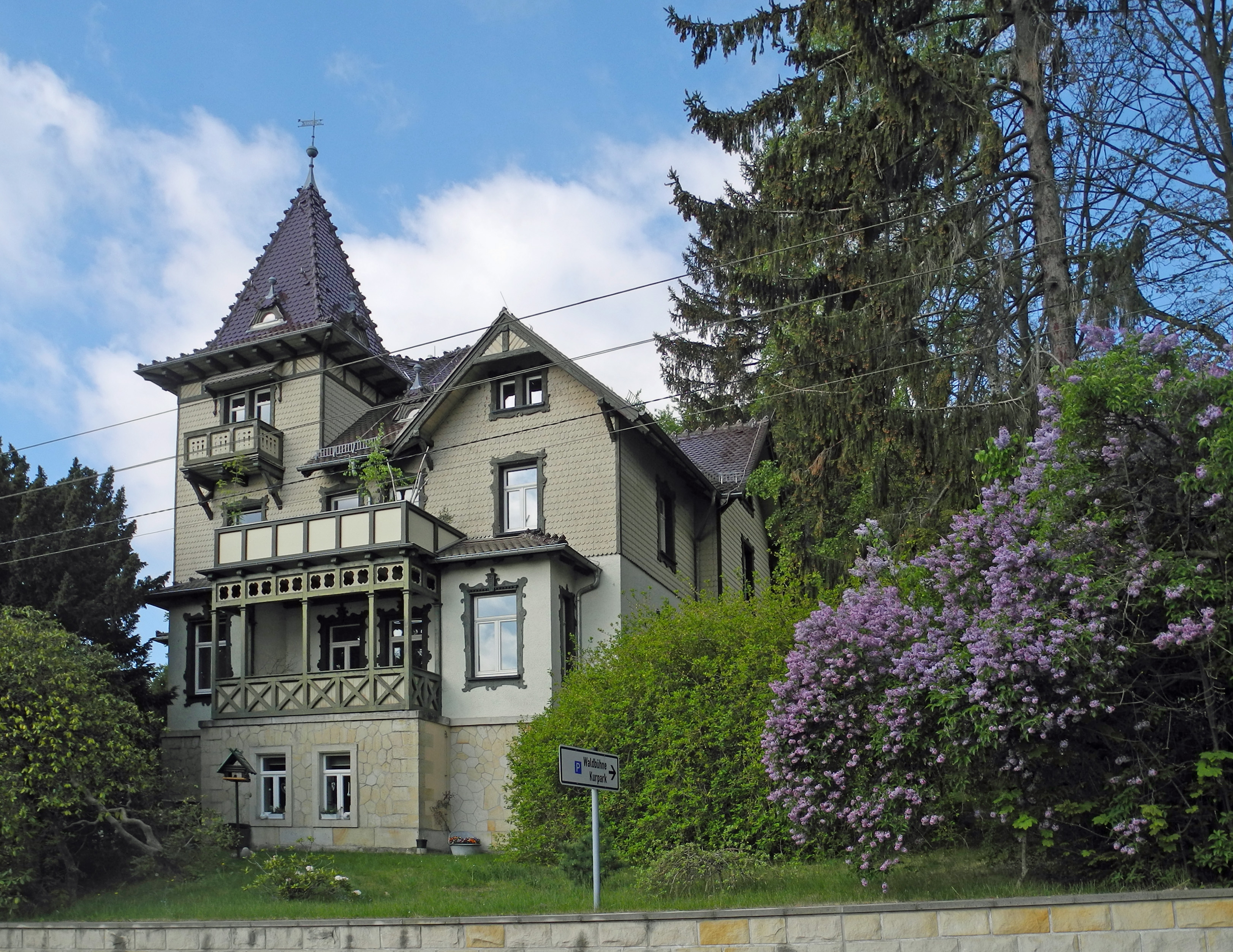
Ernemann summer villa Heinrichs Eck at 21 Am Hartheberg, Hartha

== Personal life and legacy ==
In 1908, after persuading thirteen fellow entrepreneurs to join him, Ernemann was instrumental in the creation of a chair for photography and a photo laboratory at the Technical University of Dresden, reflecting a desire of the photographic industry in Dresden to cooperate with the educational and research institutes. The group also supported a school for training photo retailers which in turn attracted 136 photographers and 90 manufacturers of photographic equipment and materials, as well as printing and press companies, to the city whose population then was a mere 399,740. Later, Ernemann and his son Alexander became founding members of the Society of Sponsors and Friends of the Technical University of Dresden. The awarding of the honorary doctorate (as Dr.-Ing. E. h.) of the Technical University of Dresden on 24. July 1924 was in appreciation of his life's work in the promotion of scientific and educational film.

Ernemann's wife Marie Therese had died on 22 August 1917, and eleven years later, he died aged 78 on 16 May 1928 in his summer villa Heinrichs Eck at 21 Am Hartheberg in the spa town of Hartha, built in 1900 and since restored. He was survived by his children Frieda Henriette Marie Therese (1876–1954), Alexander Karl Heinrich (1878–1956), Anna Katharina Gertrud (1880–1940), Dora Bertha Johanna (1883–1942) and Fritz Henry Otto (1886–1941). Heinrich Ernemann's grave is located in the Johannisfriedhof in Dresden-Tolkewitz.

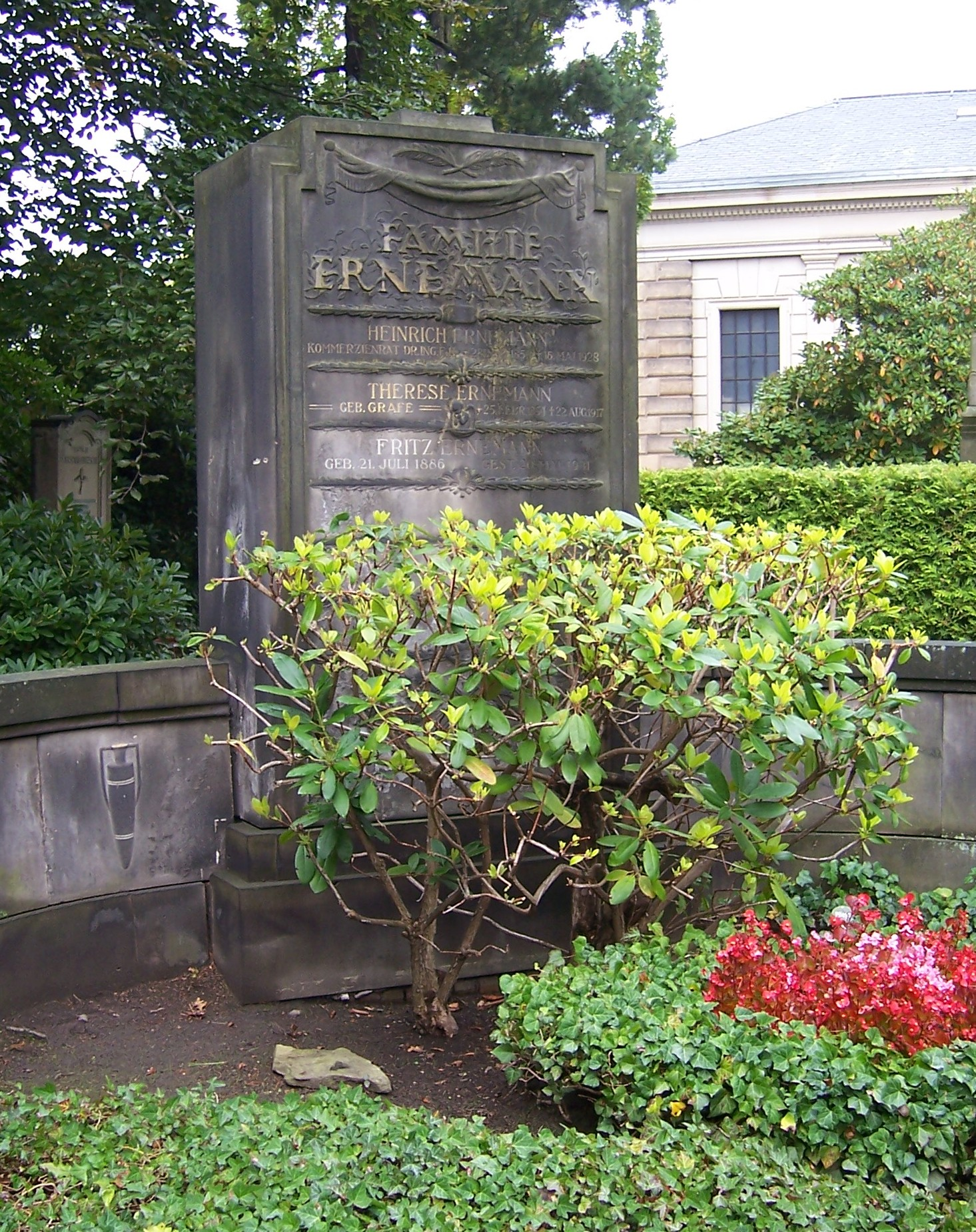
Ernemann family tomb, Johannisfriedhof, Dresden

The villa at 8 Justinenstraße in Dresden-Blasewitz, occupied in 1891 by the Ernemann family, was destroyed on 13 February 1945 in the bombing of Dresden, and its ruin was demolished in the post-war period. In its place today is a block of flats.

Ernemann's daughter Anna Katharina Gertrud was the mother of AEG manager C. Johannes G. Heyne.
