= Adnan Nawaz =

British news anchor

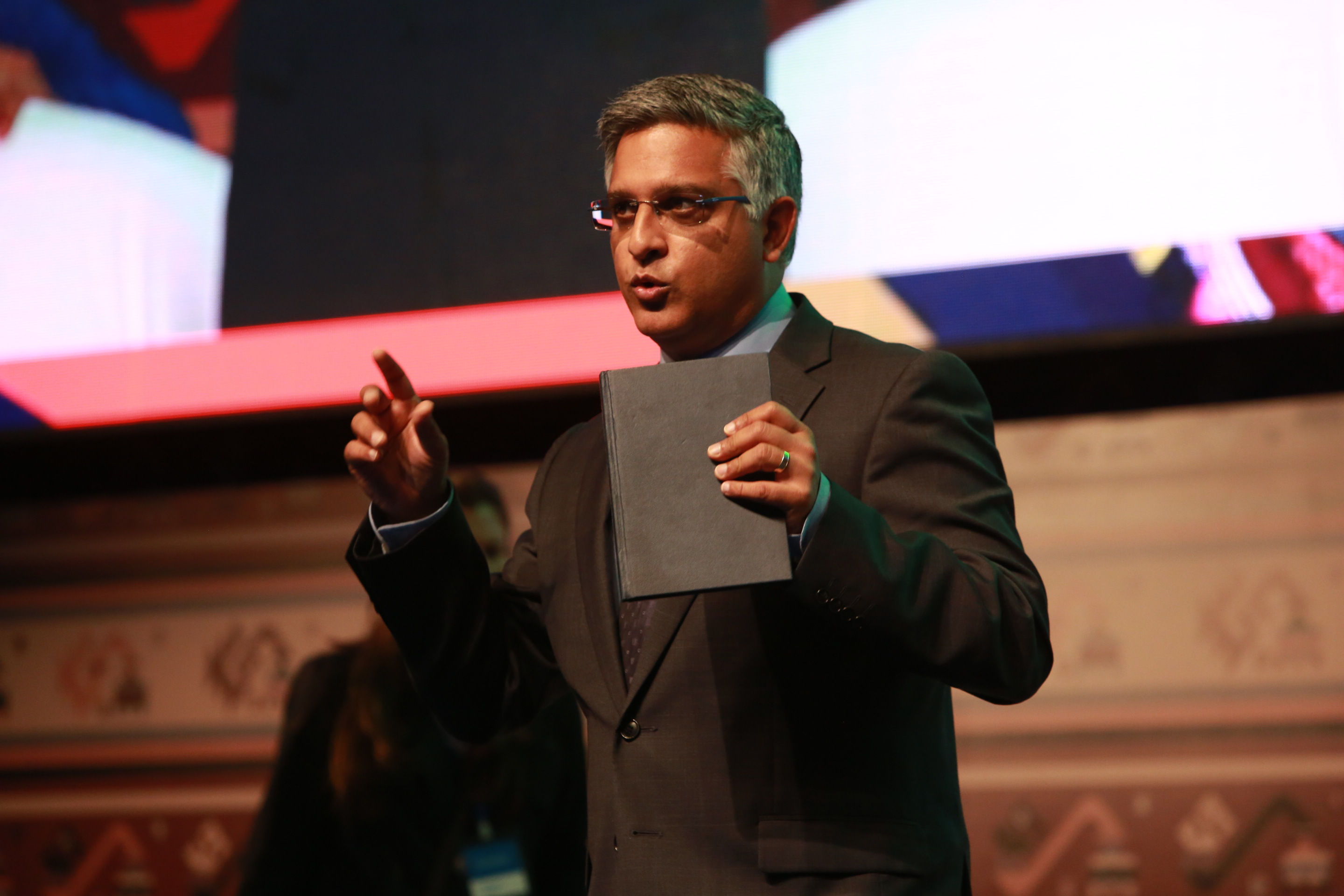
- Nawaz in 2014
- Born: Peshawar, Pakistan
- Occupations: Journalist, presenter
- Notable credit(s): TRT World; World News Today; BBC World News; Sport Today; Newsday

Adnan Nawaz (Urdu: عدنان نواز) is a British news anchor who is currently working for the TRT World.

== Early life ==
Born in Peshawar, Pakistan, Nawaz graduated from the London School of Economics with a BSc (Econ) International Relations, and then completed an MA in Latin American Politics at the Institute of Latin American Studies, University of London.

== Broadcasting career ==
Nawaz began work at the BBC in the early 1990s, as a broadcast assistant in the Latin American section of the BBC World Service. A Sony Award winning producer with BBC Radio, where he spent five years producing live programmes and making documentaries for 5 Live and Radio 4, he moved in 2000 to TV Sports News, presenting the sport on the BBC News Channel and BBC World News. He has reported and presented from the world's biggest sporting events, including the Olympic Games, the FIFA World Cup, UEFA European Championship, ICC Cricket World Cup, Wimbledon and more.

From 2009 to 2015, he read the news on the BBC News channel and BBC World News. On BBC World News he has co-presented the network's main Asian-facing programme, Newsday, and was the anchor of the main European-facing breakfast time programme.

In September 2015, TRT World announced that Nawaz was being hired as a TRT World news anchor.
