= Collings Productions =

Australian design studio

Collings Productions was an Australian design studio, founded by Geoffrey Collings and his wife Dulcie "Dahl" Collings.

== History ==
Dahl Collings was born Dulcie May Willmott in Adelaide in 1909, a daughter of teacher Josiah Percival Willmott BSc and his wife Mabel Willmott, née McCullough. She was a trained artist, having studied at East Sydney Technical College under Rayner Hoff and at the J. S. Watkins Art School.

She married Geoffrey Franklin Collings (born 10 November 1905) on 15 December 1933. He called her "Dahl", by which name she was known thereafter. In 1935 they left for London, where Dahl was employed by László Moholy-Nagy, a director of the Bauhaus school, who designed much of the visual merchandising and displays for the menswear company Simpsons of Piccadilly, while Geoffrey was with Erwin Wasey, an American advertising agency. Geoffrey was no newcomer to London, having worked for W. H. Smith in 1930.

Geoff, Dahl, and Alistair Morrison held an exhibition called "Three Australians" at the Lund Humphries Galleries in 1938, receiving a favorable notice from E. McKnight Kauffer.

Their film-making career began in 1935 and 1936 in the Spanish Pyrenees, shooting several rolls of film, which became their documentary Alquezar , and on their return from Europe, in Tahiti.

They returned to Sydney and set up a design studio with Richard Haughton James. Among other projects, Dahl designed costumes for the 1946 film The Overlanders and Eureka Stockade of 1949.

Geoffrey found work as a film director with the Commonwealth Government's Department of Information.

Sometime around 1950 they moved to New York City, where Dahl was employed by the Australian Trade Commission as a design consultant at the Rockefeller Center. They returned to Sydney in 1953 and set up Collings Productions as documentary film makers, with Geoffrey and Dahl as producers and designers. Their productions include:

- The Long Journey (1954) – Shot in Korea during the war, and narrated by David Nettheim, the 30-minute documentary was an official selection of the 1956 Berlin Film Festival.
- Australia Builds (1957) – For the United Nations and the World Bank
- The Big Boomerang (1962) – Qantas Airlines
- Sidney Nolan (1962) – The artist
- The Dreaming (1963) – Aboriginal rock art in Arnhem Land (copy held by ACMI)
- Pattern of Life (1964) – Aboriginal bark paintings in Arnhem Land (copy held by ACMI)
- Toehold in History (1965) – Sidney Nolan's Gallipoli paintings, with George Johnston as scriptwriter, marking the 50th anniversary of the campaign.
- The Australians: The Second Assault (1966) – Qantas and the Commonwealth Development Bank, also in book form
- Australian Painters 1964–1966: The Harold Mertz Collection (1966) – Directed by Dahl Collings, narrated by Ron Haddrick
- Fiji Harvest (1968) – for South Pacific Sugar Mills

In June 1998, at a Special General Meeting, shareholders in the company resolved to wind up its affairs

== Family ==
Their daughter Donna was born in Europe in 1937. On returning to Australia they had a home at 31 Captain Pipers Road, Vaucluse, where daughter Silver Ley Collings was born on 3 April 1940.

Dahl died in 1988 and Geoffrey in 2000
