= Keturah Anne Collings =

British artist

- Born: Keturah Anne Beedle; 1862; Weston-super-Mare, England
- Died: 1948 (aged 85–86); London, England
- Known for: Painting, Photography
- Spouse: Arthur Albert Esme Collings (m. 1887; died 1936)

Keturah Anne Collings (1862-1948) was a British painter and photographer.

== Biography ==
Collings née Beedle was born in 1862 in Weston-super-Mare, England. She started her artistic career as a portrait artist and miniaturist. In 1887 she married Arthur Albert Esme Collings (1859-1936). During the late 1900s she assisted her husband at his photography studio in Brighton and Hove before opening her own London photographic studio in the early 1900s.

Collings worked creating portraits, both painted and photographic, until her death in 1948 in London. Her work is in the collections of the National Portrait Gallery, London (as Keturah Ann Collings) and the Tate Gallery (as Keturah Collings).

== Gallery ==
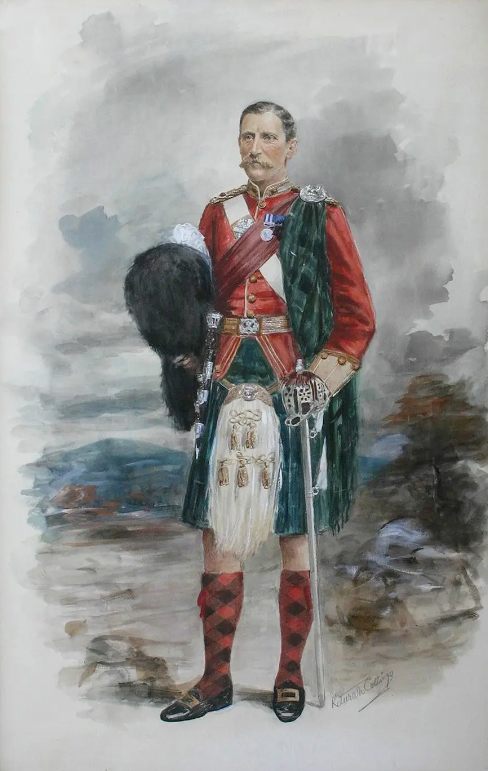
Major Arthur Pain, c.1882

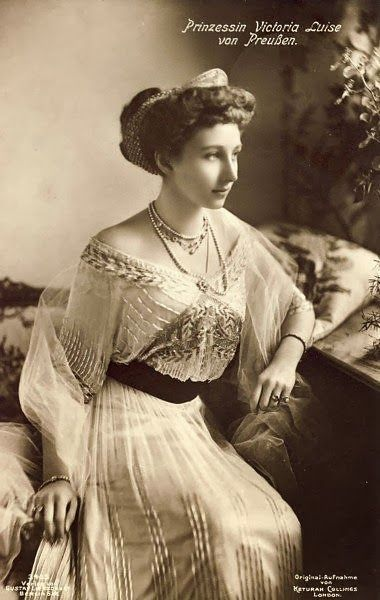
Victoria Louise of Prussia, Duchess of Brunswick

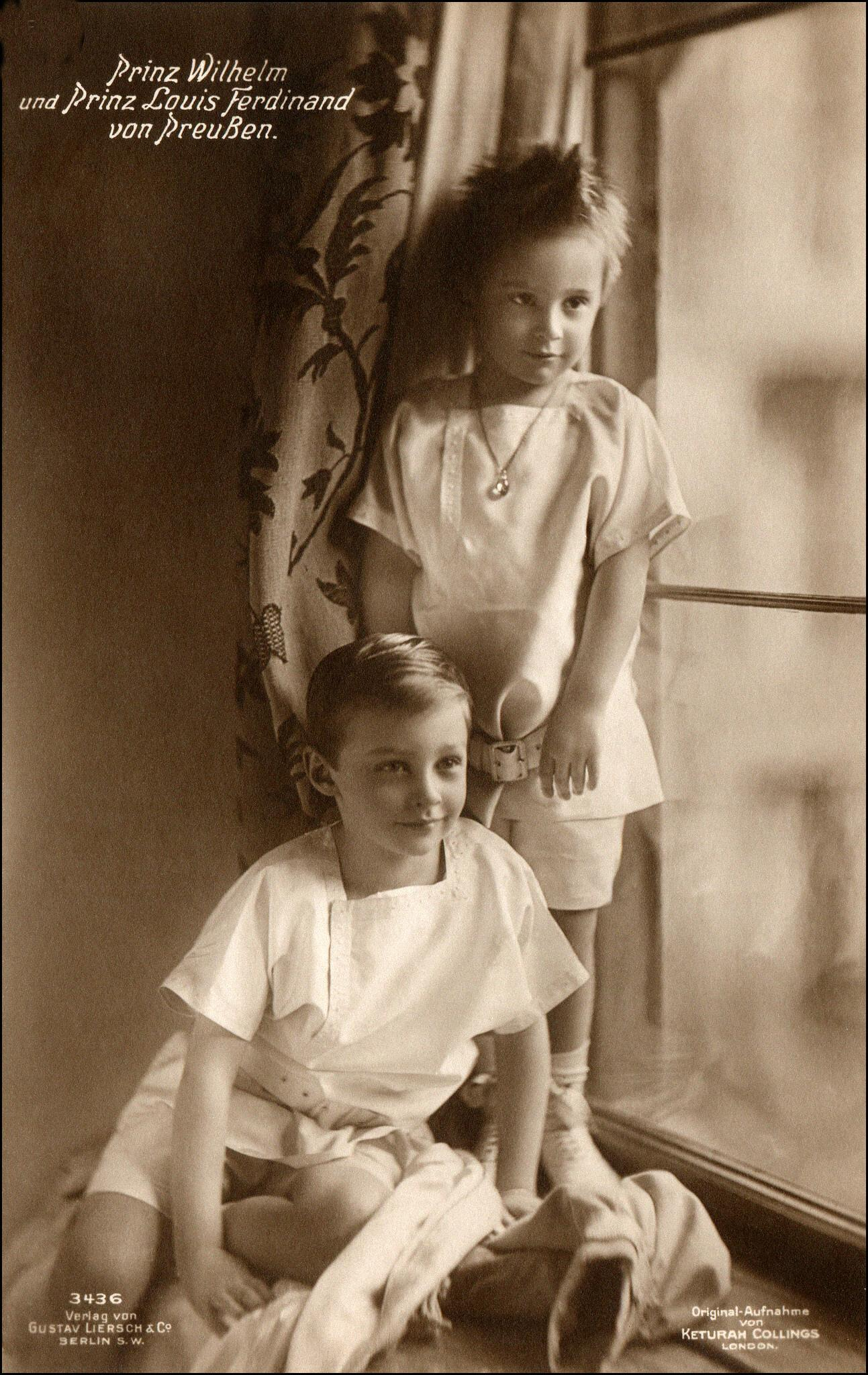
Prinz Wilhelm und Prinz Louis Ferdinand von Preußen, 1913

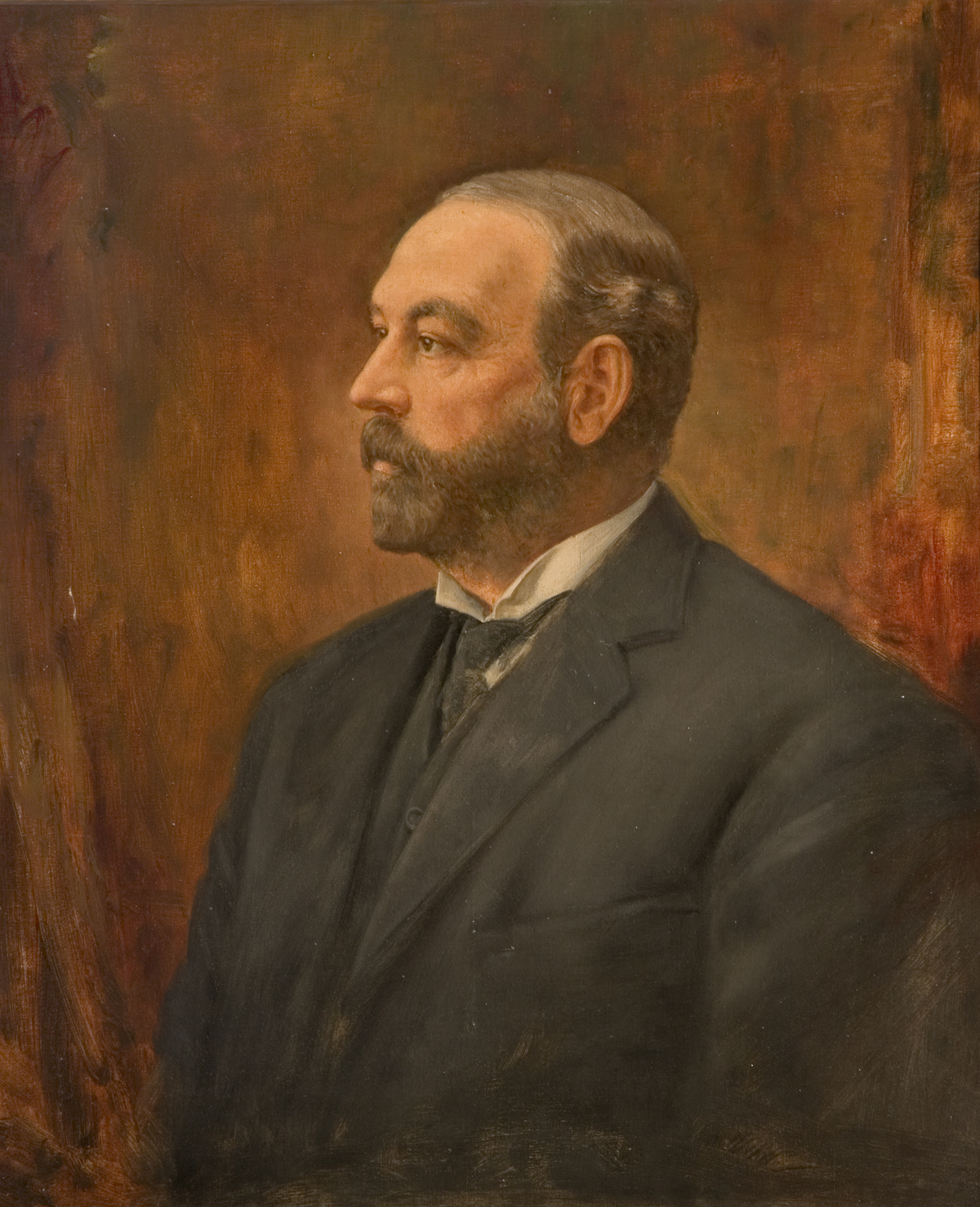
Robert George Paterson, OBE, c.1940
