= Auguste van Biene =

Dutch composer, cellist and actor (1849–1913)

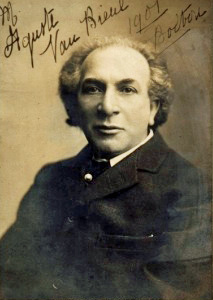
- Auguste van Biene in 1907
- Born: 16 May 1849; Rotterdam, Netherlands
- Died: 23 January 1913 (aged 63); Brighton, Sussex, England
- Occupations: Composer, cellist and actor
- Notable work: The Broken Melody
- Father: Joseph Abraham van Biene

Auguste van Biene (16 May 1849 – 23 January 1913) was a Dutch composer, cellist and actor. He became best known for his composition The Broken Melody, performed by the composer as part of a musical play of the same name.

Van Biene grew up in Rotterdam and displayed a musical interest as a youth. After some private studies with Adrien Francois Servais at the Brussels Conservatory he moved to London to seek work as a performer. Van Biene was discovered by Sir Michael Costa, who hired him to play the cello in his Covent Garden orchestra in November 1867, eventually promoting him to principal cellist.

In 1878 van Biene was a touring musical director for Richard D'Oyly Carte's Comedy Opera Company, and in the 1880s he conducted successful light operas and Victorian burlesques. By the 1880s he had also become a theatrical manager as well as an actor and playwright. As a cellist he was invited to be an examiner at the Royal Academy of Music in 1884. In 1892 he commissioned, wrote the score for, and starred in a musical play, the highly successful The Broken Melody, in which he toured for many years. He died on 23 January 1913 while on stage at the Brighton Hippodrome.

== Early life and career ==
Van Biene was born Ezechiel van Biene, in Rotterdam, the son of an actor. His parents were Joseph Abraham van Biene and Eva (née van Norden). He showed a musical talent at an early age and studied the cello with Adrien Francois Servais at the Brussels Conservatory. In 1864 he began playing as a section cellist with the Rotterdam Opera House Orchestra. Three years later, when he was 18, he moved to London to seek work as a performer.

Van Biene found life as a young musician difficult, and he lived for several months in poverty, busking on street corners to pay for rent and food. His fortunes changed when Sir Michael Costa heard him performing on the street in Hanover Square. Costa was so impressed that he hired van Biene to play the cello in his Covent Garden orchestra in November 1867. Over the next 10 years, van Biene performed as the cellist for many different orchestras and eventually became the principal cellist in Costa's orchestra. He never forgot the help Costa had given him, and for the rest of his life he marked the anniversary of their first meeting by playing in the streets of London's West End, raising money for performers' charities.

Van Biene soon earned enough money to buy a cello from the Italian cellist Alfredo Piatti, which he used until 1905. He learnt to conduct and to direct theatre productions. In 1878 he succeeded Hamilton Clarke as musical director for Richard D'Oyly Carte's Comedy Opera Company in touring productions of The Sorcerer and H.M.S. Pinafore. Carte's former co-directors of the company mounted a rival version of H.M.S. Pinafore in London for which van Biene was the conductor, and which lasted 91 performances. He eventually formed his own opera company, and by the 1880s he had become a theatrical manager as well as an actor and playwright, writing and performing under the name "Henri Tempo". Among his successes as manager were provincial tours of English adaptations of light operas, such as Farnie and Chassaigne's Falka, and Victorian burlesques, such as Lutz, Sims and Pettitt's Faust up to Date and Carmen up to Data. As a cellist he was highly enough regarded to be invited to be an examiner at the Royal Academy of Music in 1884.

== The Broken Melody and later years ==
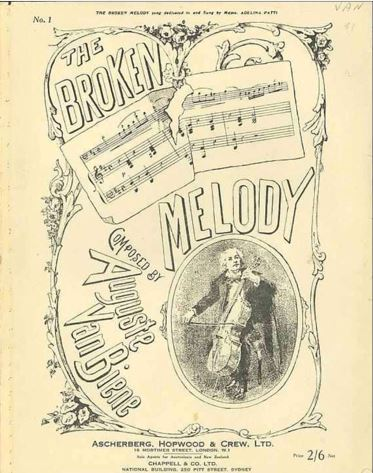
Cover page of The Broken Melody by van Biene for cello and piano, c. 1900

In 1892 van Biene commissioned and composed incidental music for a three-act play called The Broken Melody by Herbert Keen and James T. Tanner. It was produced at the Prince of Wales's Theatre in July, with van Biene taking the lead role of a musician and playing his cello as part of the play. The Times commented, "[T]he combination of music and acting, with, it must be added, plenty of sentiment, proved irresistible to the public." The show was a huge success, and the tune at the core of the work (also called "The Broken Melody") was a particular hit; van Biene claimed to have performed the number in excess of 6,000 times over his career. He varied the pieces he played during the play every night to keep it fresh. Critics were complimentary and called him the "Magician of the Cello." He toured in The Broken Melody through Britain, the United States, South Africa and Australia.

Van Biene marked his return from a tour of America in 1897 by appearing at the Grand Theatre in Hull. A critic for the Hull Daily Mail wrote that the composer "throws his whole soul into the cello, and makes it speak with sweetness, plaintiveness, passion, and excess of sensitive humanity." In 1900 van Biene was awarded a prized Stradivarius cello by the theatrical manager Sir Henry Irving to mark van Biene's 2,000th performance of The Broken Melody. That same year he performed at a private function for the singer Adelina Patti at Craig-y-Nos Castle, again to mark his 2,000th performance. In 1912 van Biene offered a prize for a new piece to complement The Broken Melody. The winner was Albert Ketèlbey, whose work The Phantom Melody became his first major success.

The Broken Melody
Zonophone X 47852, with van Biene on cello, circa 1907

Van Biene died on 23 January 1913 while on stage at the Brighton Hippodrome, playing the cello in the play "The Master Musician", with his son conducting the orchestra. Van Biene was buried in Golders Green Jewish cemetery in London, where among the mourners was the cellist and editor W. H. Squire. Van Biene's epitaph read: "The melody is broken, I shall never write again." (from Act 3 of The Broken Melody).

== Recordings ==
Kol Nidre
Zonophone A 60, with van Biene on cello, circa 1908

Van Biene made two recordings of The Broken Melody, in 1908 and 1912. Other cellists who recorded the work include John Barbirolli, Beatrice Harrison, Cedric Sharpe and W. H. Squire. Van Biene's only other known recording of his own music is his arrangement of the Jewish prayer Kol Nidre, made in about 1908, with an unidentified pianist. His recordings of works by other composers include Elgar's Salut d'Amour (1907) and Ketèlbey's The Phantom Melody (1912).
