= Francis Collings =

Francis Collings is a British journalist living and working in Paris, France, as a television news foreign correspondent. He was formerly with the BBC in London and TRT World in Istanbul.

== Career ==
At the BBC he presented on the BBC News channel, and on BBC World News. He also presented on BBC One news bulletins as well as BBC Breakfast.

As a BBC News sports reporter, he covered sporting events including football World Cups, Olympics, Paralympics, and Wimbledon Tennis. He has also covered political events and reported on court cases at Royal Courts of Justice in London.

Prior to the BBC he worked for Talk Radio UK, Independent Radio News, Radio TV Hong Kong, LBC, the BBC World Service and BBC Radios 1, 2, 4 and 5. He has also written articles for the national press in the United Kingdom including the Scotsman, the Guardian and the London Evening Standard.

For TRT World he covered a variety of stories.

== Key assignments ==
In 2016, while Collings was reporting live on TRT World from Kilis, Turkey, a missile fired by Islamic State militants exploded into a building directly behind him.

He has lived and worked in ten countries including Belize, Germany, Cyprus, Spain, Syria and Turkey. And was based in Damascus, studying Arabic and Middle East politics, when the Syrian civil war began in 2011.

Other assignments have included:

- Reporting from Kiev on Ukraine - Russia conflict
- Covering French Presidential elections from Paris
- Embedded with peace activists on a protest boat heading to Gaza
- Reporting on Syrian refugees in Lebanon and Germany
- Interviewing ISIS prisoners in a refugee camp in Iraq
- Chasing drug smugglers with Spanish police off the coast of Morocco
- Covered in depth the Catalan referendum in Barcelona
