= Frogman =

Tactical scuba diver

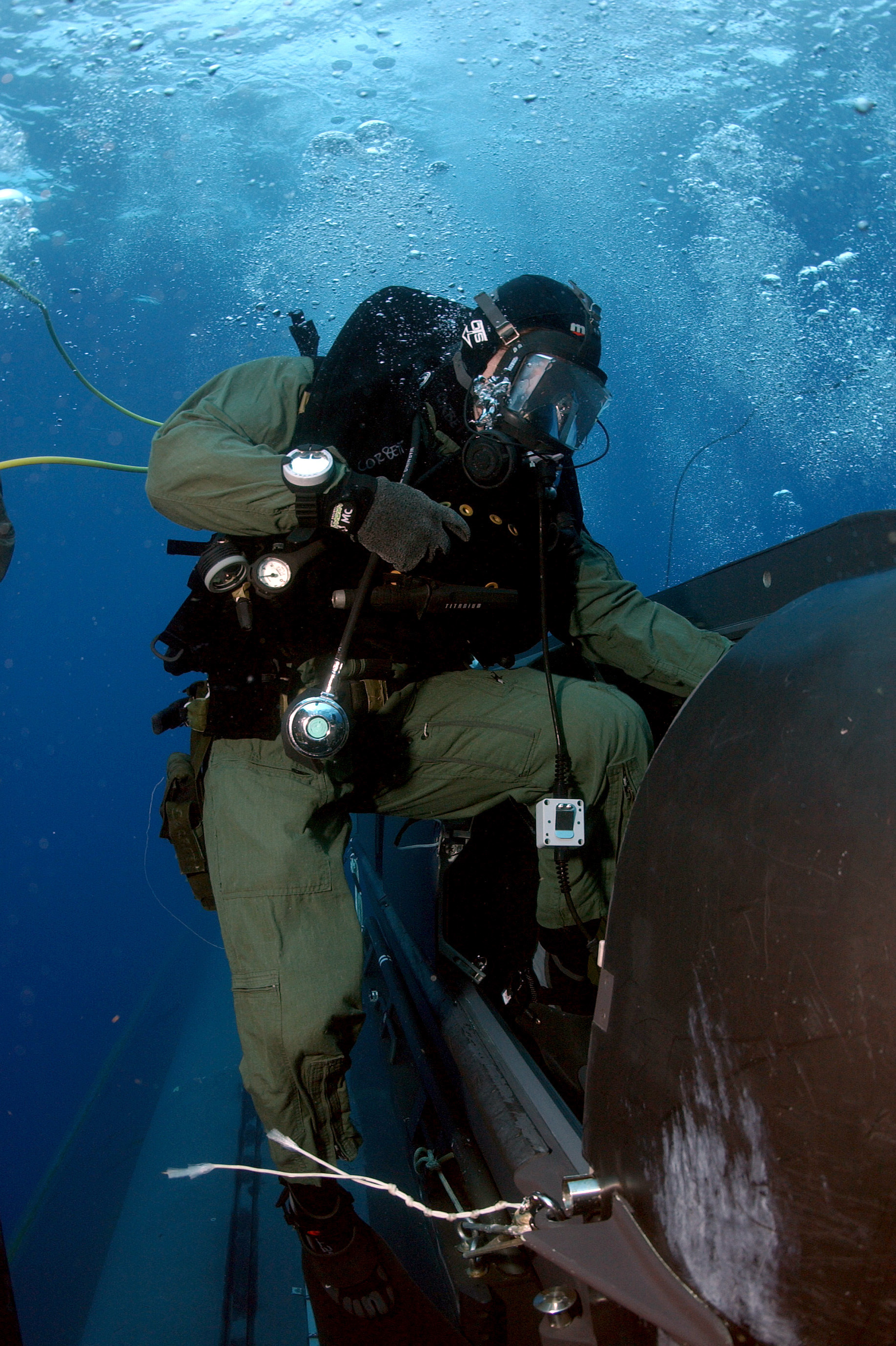
A SEAL Delivery Team member climbs aboard a delivery vehicle before launching from the back of the submarine USS Philadelphia.

A frogman is someone who is trained in scuba diving or swimming underwater. The term often applies more to professional rather than recreational divers, especially those working in a tactical capacity that includes military, and in some European countries, police work. Such personnel are also known by the more formal names of combat diver, combatant diver, or combat swimmer. The word frogman first arose in the stage name the "Fearless Frogman" of Paul Boyton in the 1870s and later was claimed by John Spence, an enlisted member of the U.S. Navy and member of the OSS Maritime Unit, to have been applied to him while he was training in a green waterproof suit.

The term frogman is occasionally used to refer to a civilian scuba diver, such as in a police diving role.

In the United Kingdom, police divers have often been called "police frogmen". Some countries' tactical diver organizations include a translation of the word frogman in their official names, e.g., Denmark's Frømandskorpset; others call themselves "combat divers" or similar.

== Scope of operations ==
Tactical diving is a branch of professional diving carried out by armed forces and tactical units. They may be divided into:

- Combat or assault divers.
- Special mission work divers (called "clearance divers" in the British Royal Navy and Royal Australian Navy), who do general work underwater.
- Work divers who are trained in defusing mines and removing other explosives underwater.

These groups may overlap, and the same men may serve as assault divers and work divers, such as the Australian Clearance Diving Branch (RAN).

The range of operations performed by these operatives includes:

- Amphibious assault: stealthy deployment of land or boarding forces. The vast majority of combat swimmer missions are simply to get "from here to there" and arrive suitably equipped and in sufficient physical condition to fight on arrival. The deployment of tactical forces by water to assault land targets, oil platforms, or surface ship targets (as in boardings for seizure of evidence) is a major driver behind the equipping and training of combat swimmers. The purposes are many, but include feint and deception, counter-drug, law enforcement, counter-terrorism, and counter-proliferation missions.
- Sabotage: This includes putting limpet mines on ships.
- Clandestine surveying and reconnaissance: Surveying a beach before a troop landing, or other forms of unauthorized underwater surveying and reconnaissance in denied waters.
- Clandestine underwater work, e.g.:
  - Recovering underwater objects.
  - Clandestine fitting of monitoring devices on submarine communications cables in enemy waters.
- Investigating unidentified divers, or a sonar echo that may be unidentified divers. Police diving work may be included.
- Checking ships, boats, structures, and harbors for limpet mines and other sabotage; and ordinary routine maintenance in war conditions.
- Underwater mine clearance and bomb disposal.

Typically, a diver with closed circuit oxygen rebreathing equipment will stay within a depth limit of 20 feet (6.1 m) with limited deeper excursions to a maximum of 50 feet (15 m) because of the risk of seizure due to acute oxygen toxicity. The use of nitrox or mixed gas rebreathers can extend this depth range considerably, but this may be beyond the scope of operations, depending on the unit.

=== Defending against frogmen ===
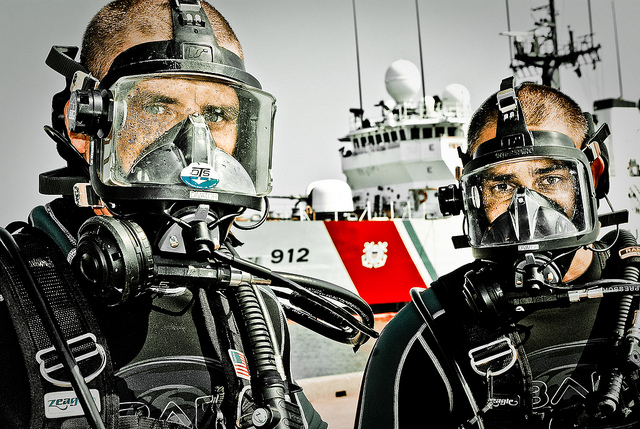
Maritime law enforcement specialists at Regional Dive Locker East in Portsmouth, Va., prepare for a training dive

Anti-frogman techniques are security methods developed to protect watercraft, ports and installations, and other sensitive resources both in or nearby vulnerable waterways from potential threats or intrusions by frogmen.

== Equipment ==
Frogmen on clandestine operations use rebreathers, as the bubbles released by open-circuit scuba would reveal them to surface lookouts and make a noise which hydrophones could easily detect.

== Origins of the name ==
A few different explanations have been given for the origin of the term frogman.

- Paul Boyton adopted the stage name The Fearless Frogman. In the 1870s, he was a long distance swimmer who wore a rubber immersion suit, with hood.
- In an interview with historian Erick Simmel, John Spence claimed that the name "frogman" was coined while he was training in a green waterproof suit, "Someone saw me surfacing one day and yelled out, 'Hey, frogman!' The name stuck for all of us."

== History ==
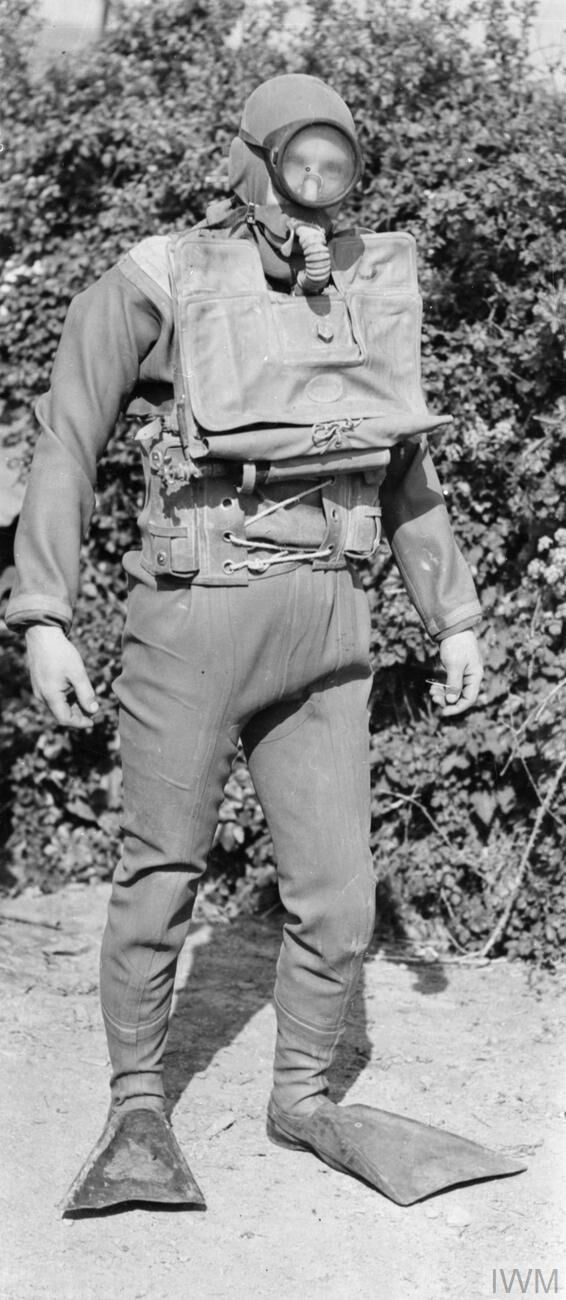
A 1945 British navy frogman with complete gear, including the Davis apparatus, a rebreather originally conceived in 1910 by Robert Davis as an emergency submarine escape set.

In ancient Roman and Greek times, there were instances of men swimming or diving for combat, sometimes using a hollow plant stem or a long bone as a snorkel. Diving with snorkel is mentioned by Aristotle (4th century BC). The earliest descriptions of frogmen in war are found in Thucydides' History of the Peloponnesian War. The first instance was in 425 BC, when the Athenian fleet besieged the Spartans on the small island of Sphacteria. The Spartans managed to get supplies from the mainland by underwater swimmers towing submerged sacks of supplies. In another incident of the same war, in 415 BC, the Athenians used combat divers in the port of Syracuse, Sicily. The Syracuseans had planted vertical wooden poles in the bottom around their port, to prevent the Athenian triremes from entering. The poles were submerged, not visible above the sea level. The Athenians used various means to cut these obstacles, including divers with saws. It is believed that the underwater sawing required snorkels for breathing and diving weights to keep the divers stable.

Also, in the writings of Al-Maqrizi, it is also claimed that the naval forces of the Fatimid Caliphate, in an engagement with Byzantine forces off the coast of Messina henceforth referred to as the Battle of the Straits, employed a novel strategy with strong similarities to modern-day frogmen tactics. In the writings of Heinz Halm, who studied and translated the writings of Al-Maqrizi and other contemporary Islamic historians, it is described: "They would dive from their own ship and swim over to the enemy ship; they would fasten ropes to its rudder, along which earthenware pots containing Greek fire were then made to slide over to the enemy ship, and shattered on the sternpost." Apparently, this tactic succeeded in destroying many Byzantine vessels, and the battle ended in a major Fatimid victory; according to the Arab historians, a thousand prisoners were taken, including the Byzantine admiral, Niketas, with many of his officers, as well as a heavy Indian sword which bore an inscription indicating that it had once belonged to Muhammad.

The Hungarian Chronicon Pictum claims that Henry III's 1052 invasion of Hungary was defeated by a skillful diver who sabotaged Henry's supply fleet. The unexpected sinking of the ships is confirmed by German chronicles. On 4 November 1918, during World War I, Italian frogmen sunk the Austro-Hungarian ship Viribus Unitis.

Italy started World War II with a commando frogman force already trained. Britain, Germany, the United States, and the Soviet Union started commando frogman forces during World War II.

=== First frogmen ===
The word frogman appeared first in the stage name The Fearless Frogman of Paul Boyton, who since the 1870s broke records in long distance swimming to demonstrate a newly invented rubber immersion suit, with an inflated hood.

The first modern frogmen were the World War II Italian commando frogmen of Decima Flottiglia MAS (now "ComSubIn": Comando Raggruppamento Subacquei e Incursori Teseo Tesei) which formed in 1938 and was first in action in 1940. Originally these divers were called "Uomini Gamma" because they were members of the top secret special unit called "Gruppo Gamma", which originated from the kind of Pirelli rubber skin-suit nicknamed muta gamma used by these divers. Later they were nicknamed "Uomini Rana," Italian for "frog men", because of an underwater swimming frog kick style, similar to that of frogs, or because their fins looked like frog's feet.

This special corps used an early oxygen rebreather scuba set, the Auto Respiratore ad Ossigeno (A.R.O), a development of the Dräger oxygen self-contained breathing apparatus designed for the mining industry and of the Davis Submerged Escape Apparatus made by Siebe, Gorman & Co and by Bergomi, designed for escaping from sunken submarines. This was used from about 1920 for spearfishing by Italian sport divers, modified and adapted by the Italian navy engineers for safe underwater use and built by Pirelli and SALVAS from about 1933, and so became a precursor of the modern diving rebreather.

For this new way of underwater diving, the Italian frogmen trained in La Spezia, Liguria, using the newly available Genoese free diving spearfishing equipment; diving mask, snorkel, swimfins, and rubber dry suit, the first specially made diving watch (the luminescent Panerai), and the new A.R.O. scuba unit. This was a revolutionary alternative way to dive, and the start of the transition from the usual heavy underwater diving equipment of the hard hat divers which had been in general use since the 18th century, to self-contained divers, free of being tethered by an air line and rope connection.

=== Wartime operations ===
After Italy declared war, the Decima Flottiglia MAS (Xª MAS) attempted several frogmen attacks on British naval bases in the Mediterranean between June 1940 and July 1941, but none were successful, because of equipment failure or early detection by British forces. On September 10, 1941, eight Xª MAS frogmen were inserted by submarine close to the British harbour at Gibraltar, where using human torpedoes to penetrate the defences, sank three merchant ships before escaping through neutral Spain. An even more successful attack, the Raid on Alexandria, was mounted on 19 December on the harbour at Alexandria, again using human torpedoes. The raid resulted in disabling the battleships HMS Queen Elizabeth and HMS Valiant together with a destroyer and an oil tanker, but all six frogmen were captured. Frogmen were deployed by stealth in Algeciras, Spain, from where they launched a number of limpet-mine attacks on Allied shipping at anchor off Gibraltar. Some time later they refitted the interned Italian tanker Olterra as a mothership for human torpedoes, carrying out three assaults on ships at Gibraltar between late 1942 and early 1943, sinking six of them.

Nazi Germany raised a number of frogmen units under the auspices of both the Kriegsmarine and the Abwehr, often relying on Italian expertise and equipment. In June 1944, a K-Verband frogman unit failed to destroy the bridge at Bénouville, now known as Pegasus Bridge, during the Battle of Normandy. In March 1945, a frogman squad from the Brandenburgers was deployed from their base in Venice to destroy the Ludendorff Bridge over the Rhine which had been captured by the US Army in the Battle of Remagen. Seven frogmen swam 17 kilometres (11 mi) downriver to the bridge carrying explosives, but were spotted by Canal Defence Lights. Four died, two from hypothermia, and the rest were captured.

The British Royal Navy had captured an Italian human torpedo during a failed attack on Malta; they developed a copy called the Chariot and formed a unit called the Experimental Submarine Flotilla, which later merged with the Special Boat Service. A number of Chariot operations were attempted, most notably Operation Title in October 1942, an attack on the German battleship Tirpitz, which had to be abandoned when a storm hit the fishing boat which was towing the Chariots into position. Operation Principal in January 1943 was an attack by eight Chariots on La Maddalena and Palermo harbours; although all the Chariots were lost, the new Italian cruiser Ulpio Traiano was sunk. The last and most successful British operation resulted in sinking two liners in Phuket harbour in Thailand in October 1944. Royal Navy divers did not use fins until December 1942.

Late in the war, the Imperial Japanese Navy formed a Special Attack Unit of suicide divers, called Fukuryu ("crouching dragons"). They were to be armed with a 10kg mine on a long pole for use against Allied landing craft. Equipment consisted of a loose wet suit, a large rigid helmet and tanks attached back and front. It was intended that in the event of an invasion (Operation Downfall), they could wait underwater for up to ten hours, close to the shore and protected from bombardments by submerged concrete shelters. A training program was run at Kawatana and Yokosuka, during which there were many fatal accidents caused by the rudimentary equipment. Some 1,200 divers had completed the course by the end of the war, with a further 2,800 still in training.

=== Wartime developments ===
In 1933 Italian companies were already producing underwater oxygen rebreathers, but the first diving set known as SCUBA was invented in 1939 by Christian Lambertsen, who originally called it the Lambertsen Amphibious Respirator Unit (LARU) and patented it in 1940. He later renamed it the Self Contained Underwater Breathing Apparatus, which, contracted to SCUBA, eventually became the generic term for both open circuit and rebreather autonomous underwater breathing equipment.

Lambertsen demonstrated it to the Office of Strategic Services (OSS) (after already being rejected by the U.S. Navy) in a pool at a hotel in Washington D.C. OSS not only bought into the concept, they hired Lambertsen to lead the program and build up the dive element of their Maritime Unit. The OSS was the predecessor of the Central Intelligence Agency; the maritime element still exists inside the CIA's Special Activities Division.

John Spence, an enlisted member of the U.S. Navy, was the first man selected to join the OSS group.

=== Postwar operations ===
In April 1956, Commander Lionel Crabb, a wartime pioneer of Royal Navy combat diving, disappeared during a covert inspection of the hull of the Soviet Navy Sverdlov-class cruiser, Ordzhonikidze, while she was moored in Portsmouth Harbour.

The Shayetet 13 commandos of the Israeli Navy have carried out a number of underwater raids on harbors. They were initially trained by veterans of Xª MAS and used Italian equipment. As part of Operation Raviv in 1969, eight frogmen used two human torpedoes to enter Ras Sadat naval base near Suez, where they destroyed two motor torpedo boats with mines.

During the Vietnam War, many commando units of The People's Army of Vietnam were deployed to sabotage US Navy vessels. Notably, the attack on USNS Card that disabled USNS Card and the attack on USS Noxubee.

During the 1982 Falklands War, the Argentinian Naval Intelligence Service planned an attack on British warships at Gibraltar. Code named Operation Algeciras, three frogmen, recruited from a former anti-government insurgent group, were to plant mines on the ships' hulls. The operation was abandoned when the divers were arrested by Spanish police and deported.

In 1985, the French nuclear weapons tests at Moruroa in the Pacific Ocean was being contested by environmental protesters led by the Greenpeace campaign ship, Rainbow Warrior. The Action Division of the French Directorate-General for External Security devised a plan to sink the Rainbow Warrior while it was berthed in harbor at Auckland in New Zealand. Two divers from the Division posed as tourists and attached two limpet mines to the ship's hull; the resulting explosion sank the ship and killed a Netherlands citizen on board. Two agents from the team, but not the divers, were arrested by the New Zealand Police and later convicted of manslaughter. The French government finally admitted responsibility two months later.

In the U.S. Navy, frogmen were officially phased out in 1983 and all active duty frogmen were transferred to SEAL units. In 1989, during the U.S. invasion of Panama, a team of four U.S. Navy SEALs using rebreathers conducted a combat swimmer attack on the Presidente Porras, a gunboat and yacht belonging to Manuel Noriega. The commandos attached explosives to the vessel as it was tied to a pier in the Panama Canal, escaping only after being attacked with grenades. Three years later during Operation Restore Hope, members of SEAL Team One swam to shore in Somalia to measure beach composition, water depth, and shore gradient ahead of a Marine landing. The mission resulted in several of the SEALs becoming ill as Somalia's waters were contaminated with raw sewage.

In 1978, the U.S. Navy Special Operations Officer (1140) community was established by combining Explosive Ordnance Disposal (EOD) and Expendable Ordnance Management officers with Diving and Salvage officers. Special Ops Officers would become qualified in at least two functional areas - normally EOD or Diving and Salvage, and Expendable Ordnance management. Officers trained in diving and salvage techniques were now allowed to follow a career pattern that took advantage of their training, and Unrestricted line officers were now permitted to specialize in salvage, with repeat tours of duty, and advanced training. Career patterns were developed to ensure that officers assigned to command were seasoned in salvage operations and well qualified in the technical aspects of their trade. "The combination gave a breadth and depth of professionalism to Navy salvage that had not been possible before."

== Gallery ==
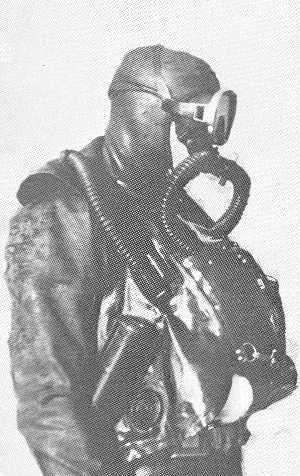
A French frogman with chest counterlung loop rebreather with two breathing tubes (model "Oxygers", 1957).

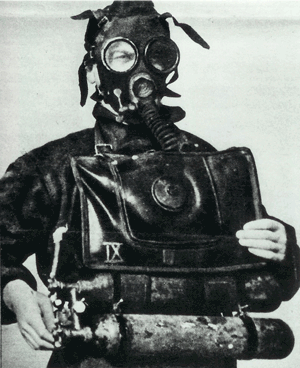
Italian World War II frogman of "Gruppo Gamma"

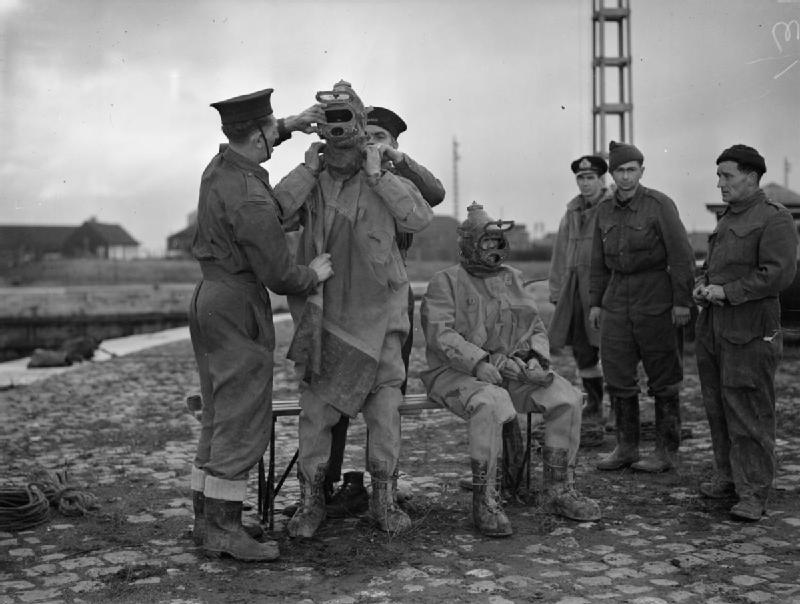
Royal Navy divers in Sladen suits during World War II

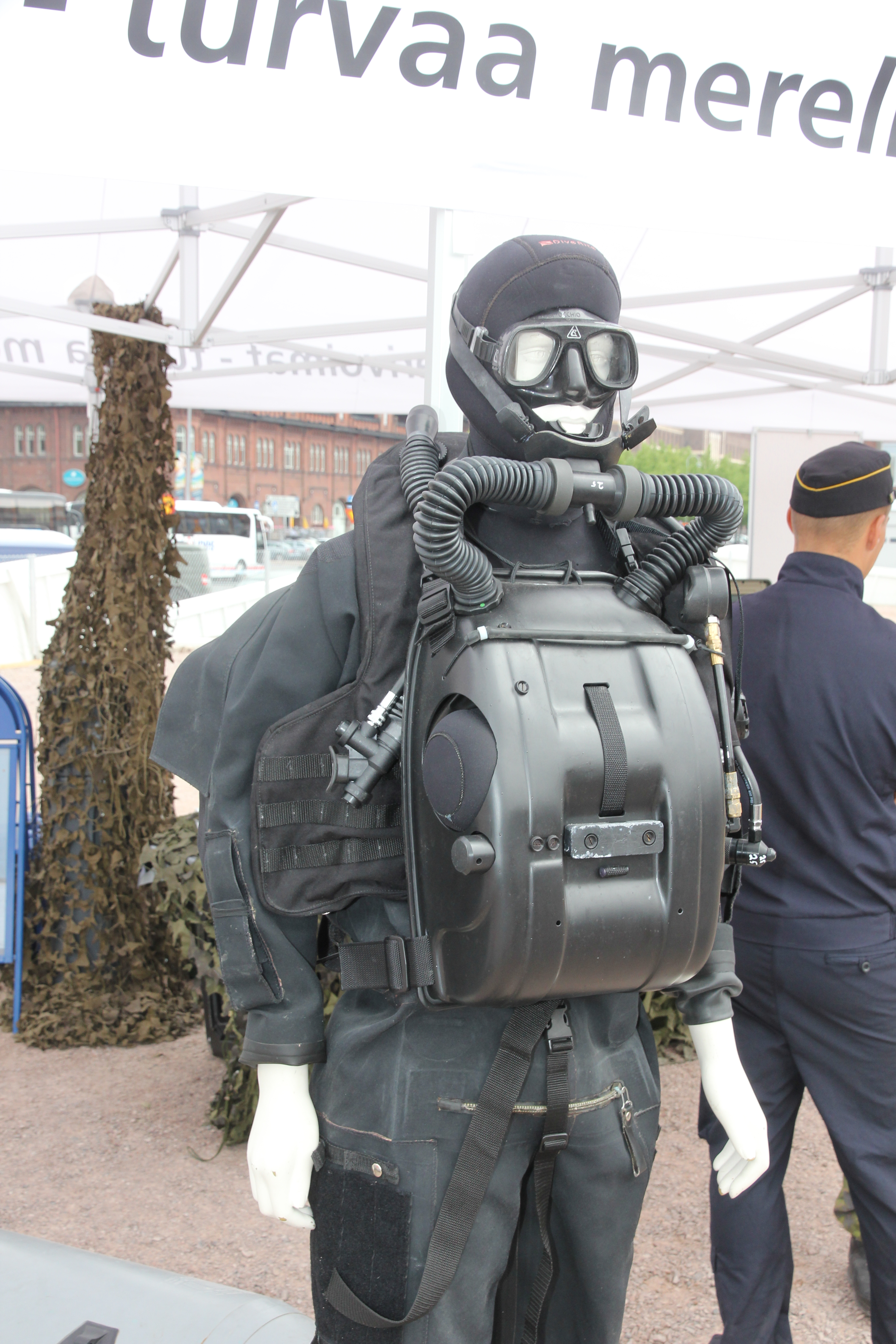
Mannequin wearing Finnish Navy combat diver equipment. The chest rebreather is likely a Viper S-10.

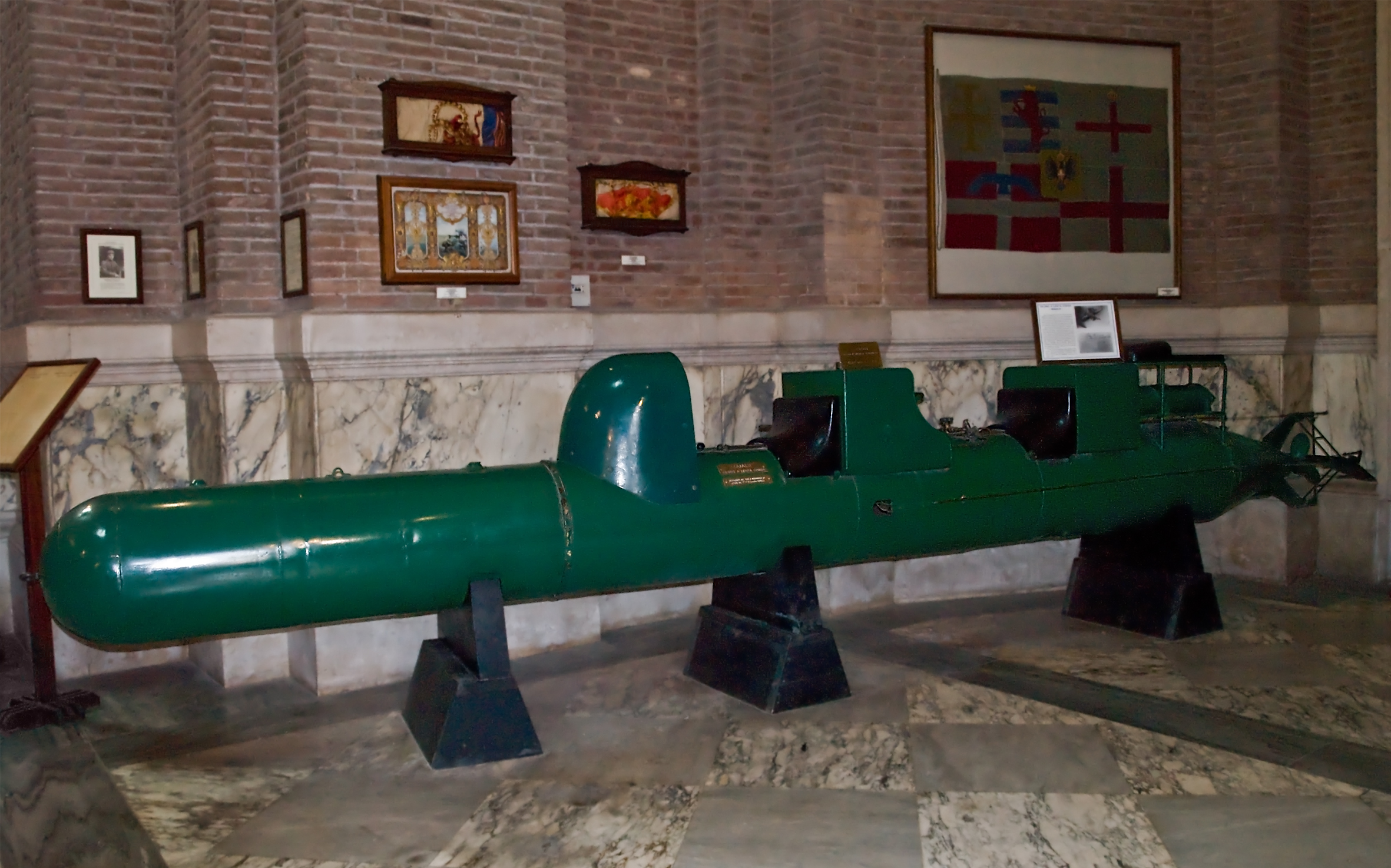
The "maiale" or "siluro a lenta corsa": first underwater transport way used by Italian frogmen in World War II

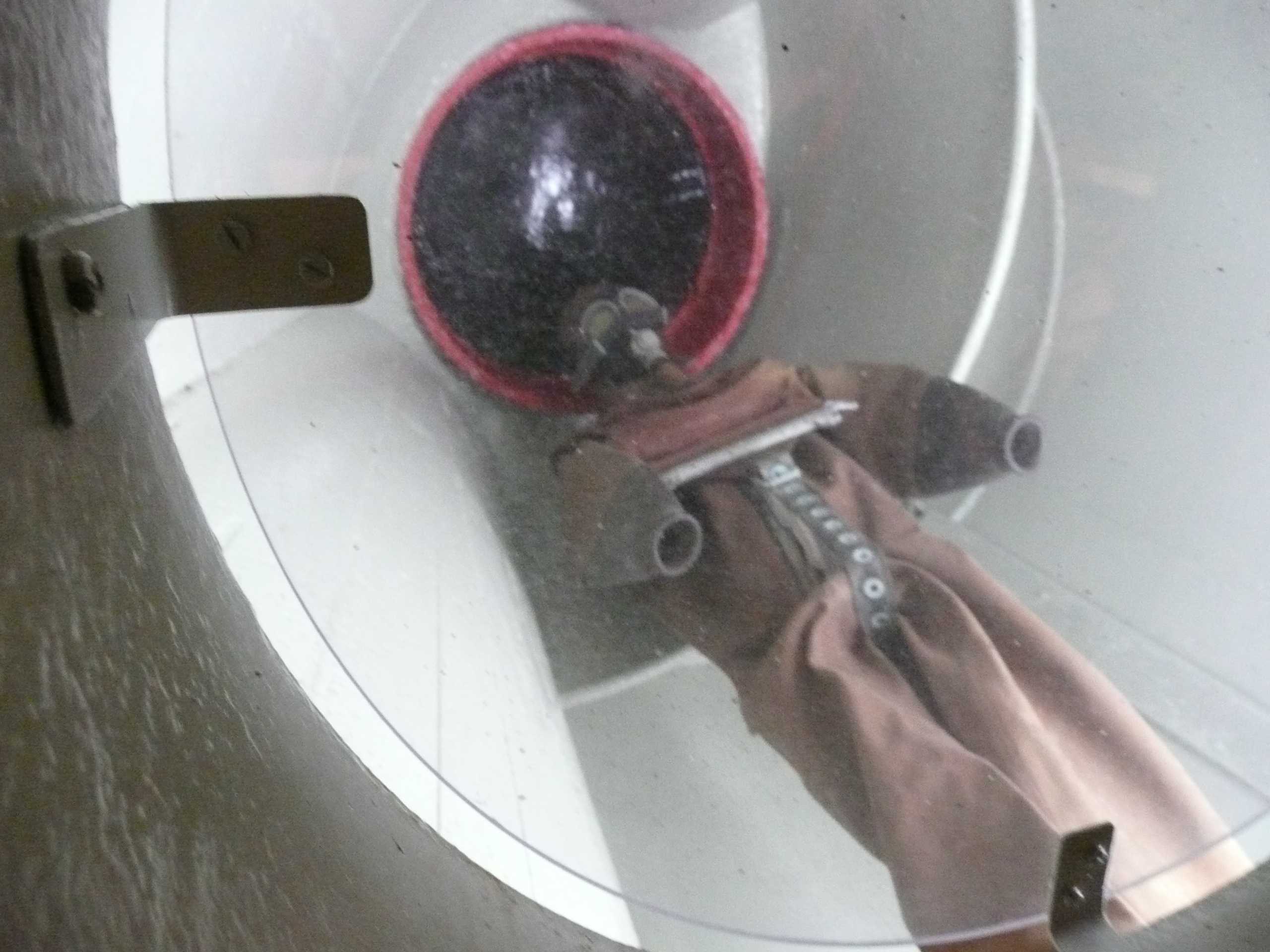
Diver lock for frogmen on a type XXI U-boat.

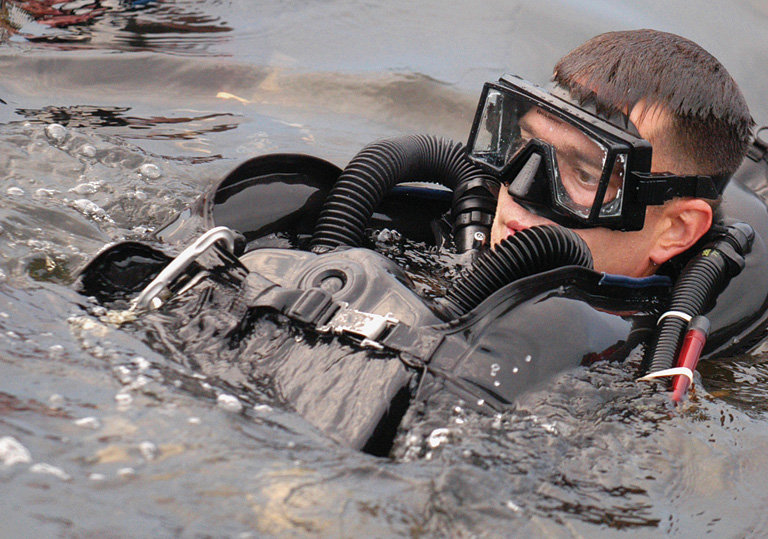
USMC 2nd Reconnaissance Battalion refreshing in combatant diving with the Draeger LAR V rebreather.

U.S. Naval combat underwater demolition team training manual (1944)

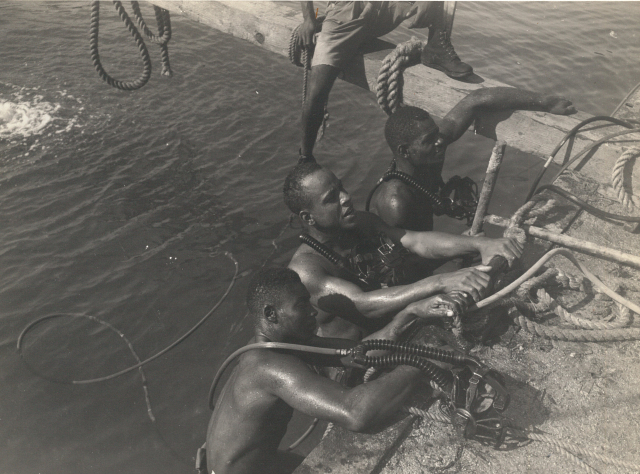
African American Seabee divers of the 34th Naval Construction Battalion at Gavutu, Solomon Islands, Nov. 8, 1943

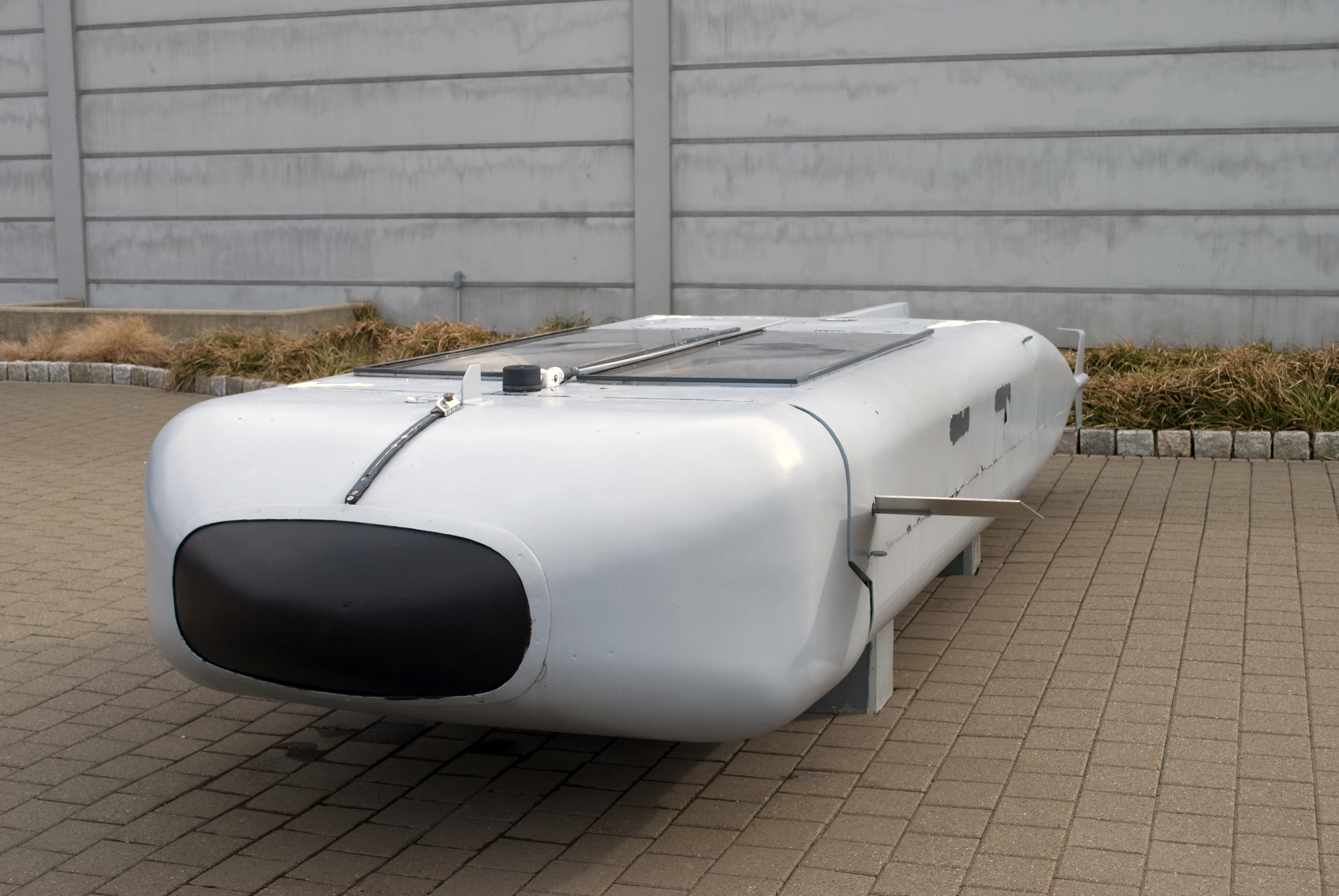
US Navy SDV MK IX Swimmer Delivery Vehicle. Non-watertight submersible held two scuba-equipped swimmers.

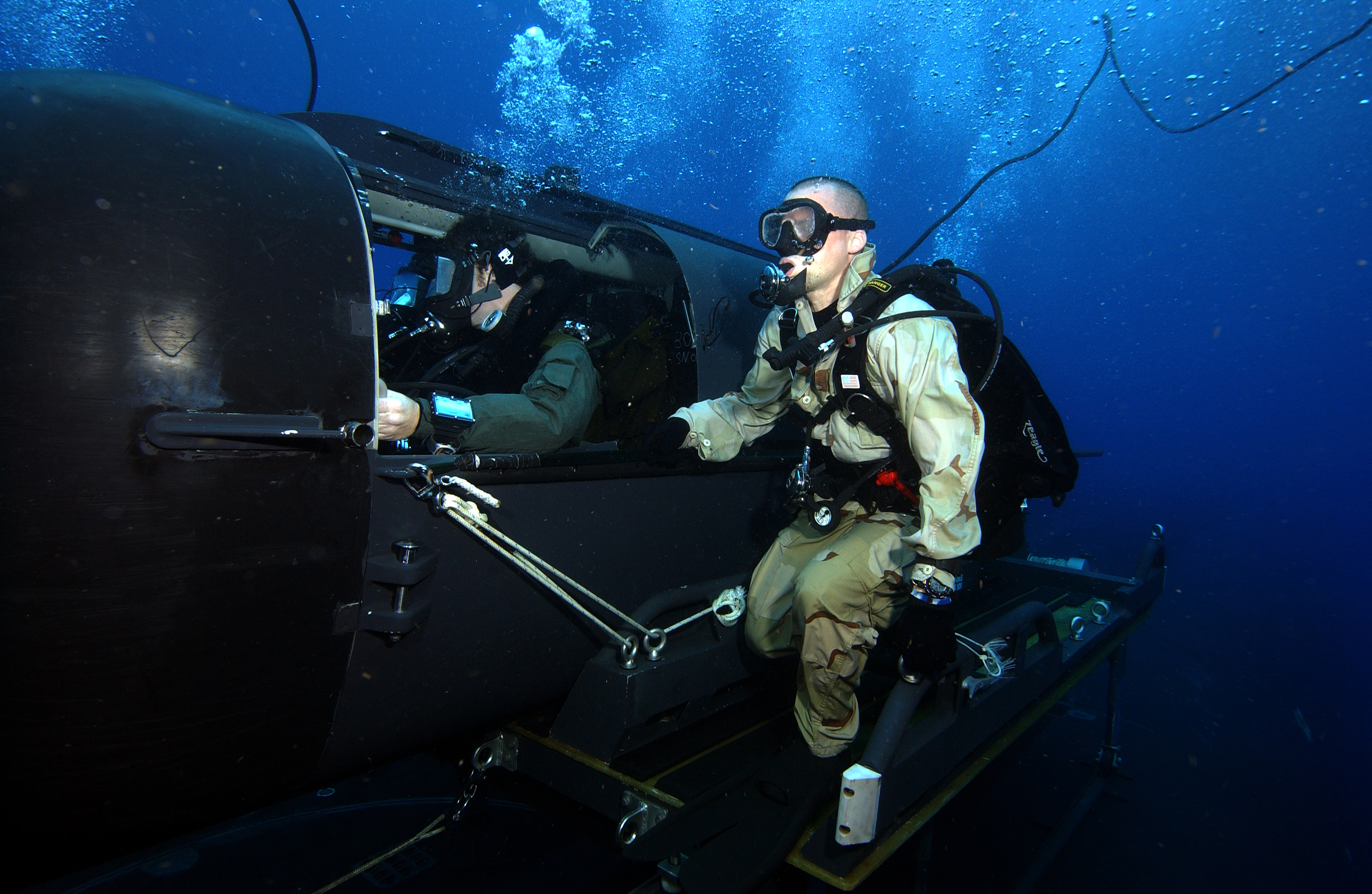
A Navy diver and special operator from SEAL Delivery Team (SDV) 2 perform SDV operations with the nuclear-powered guided-missile submarine USS Florida

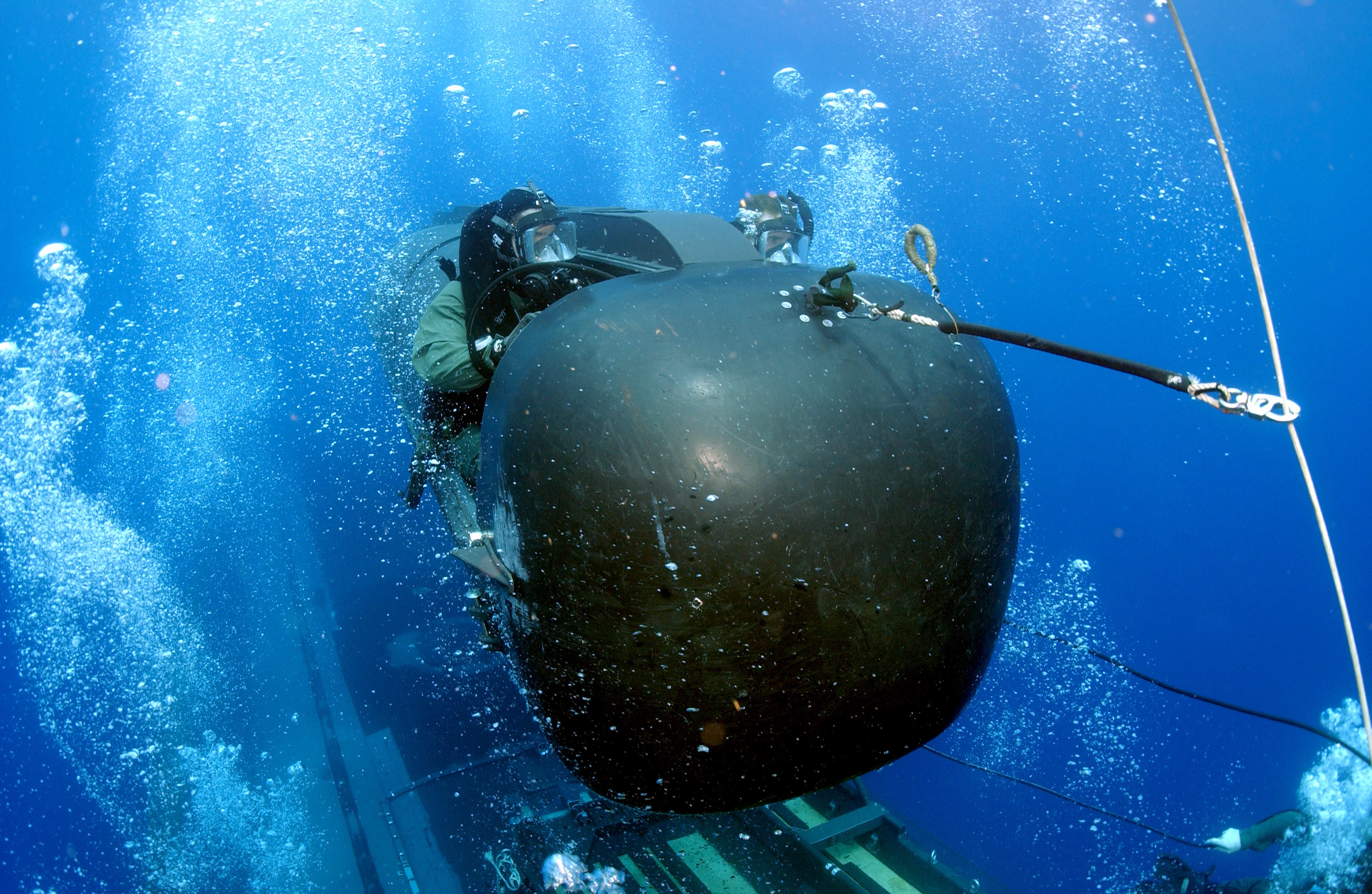
A member of SEAL Delivery Vehicle Team Two prepares to launch one of the team's SEAL Delivery Vehicles from the back of USS Philadelphia on a training exercise. The SDVs are used to carry Navy SEALs from a submerged submarine to enemy targets while staying underwater and undetected.

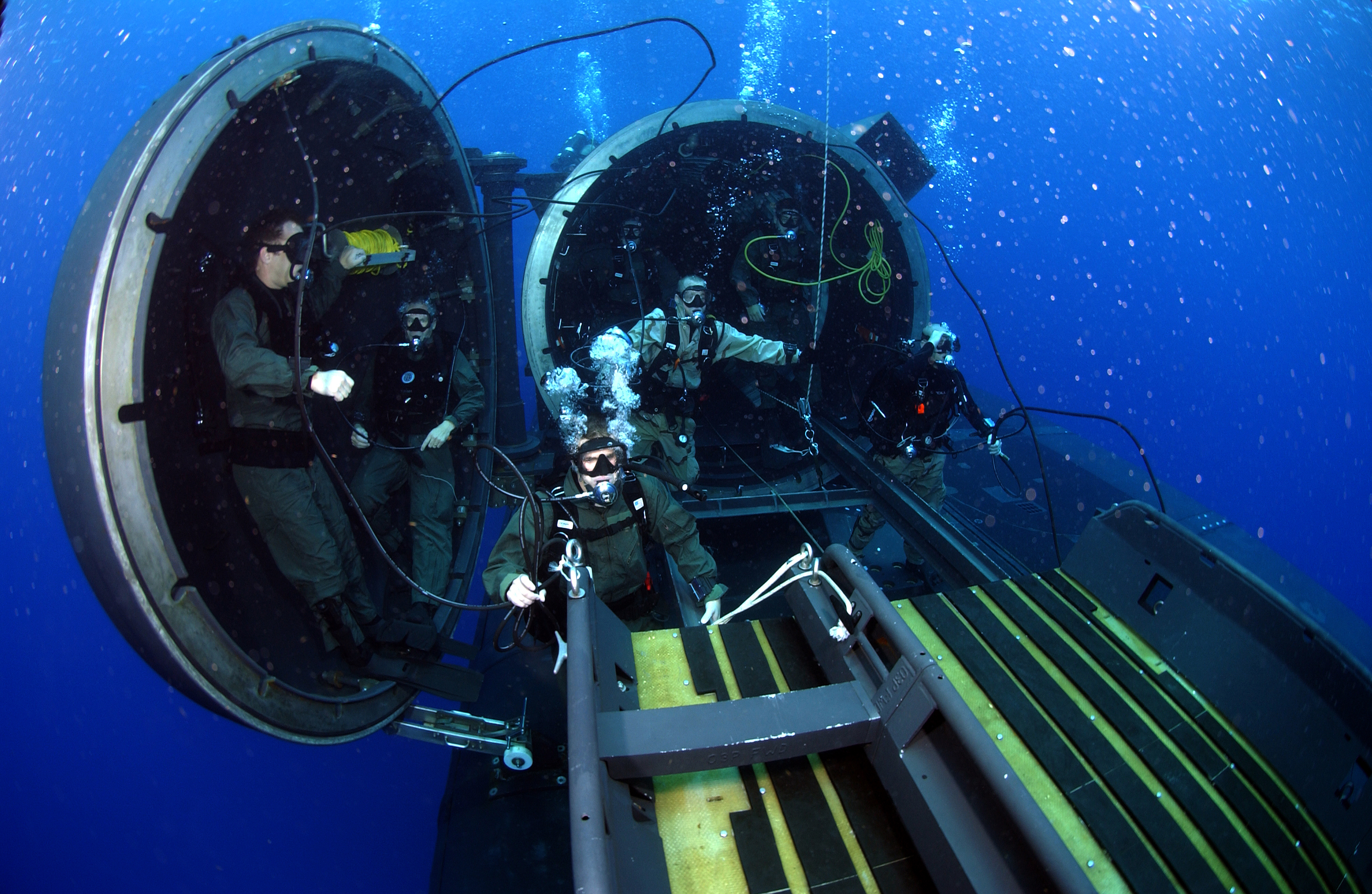
Navy divers and special operators attached to SEAL Delivery Team 2, perform SDV operations with USS Florida

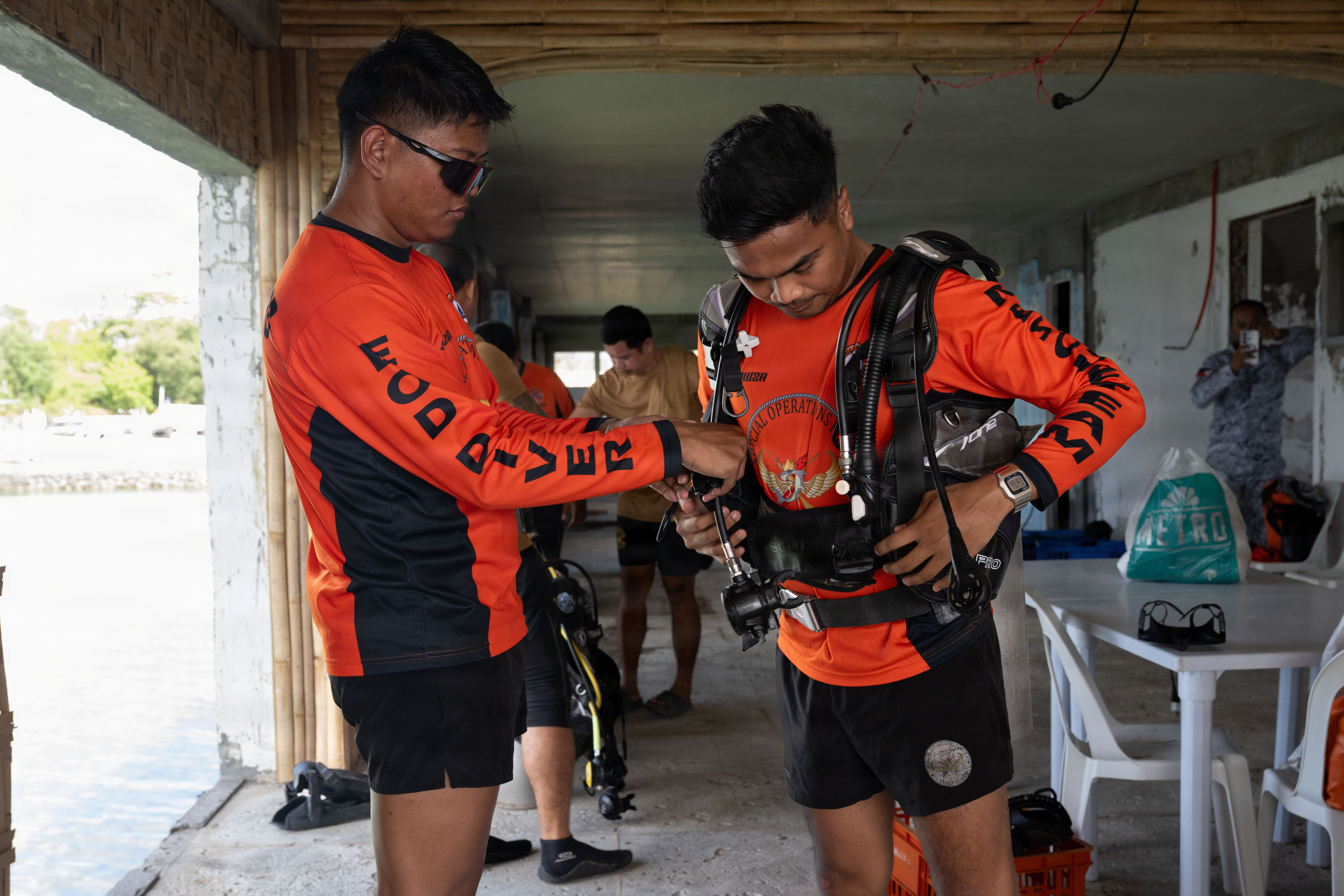
U.S. Navy EOD and Philippine EOD technicians from Naval Special Operations Command prepare to conduct shore dive training together

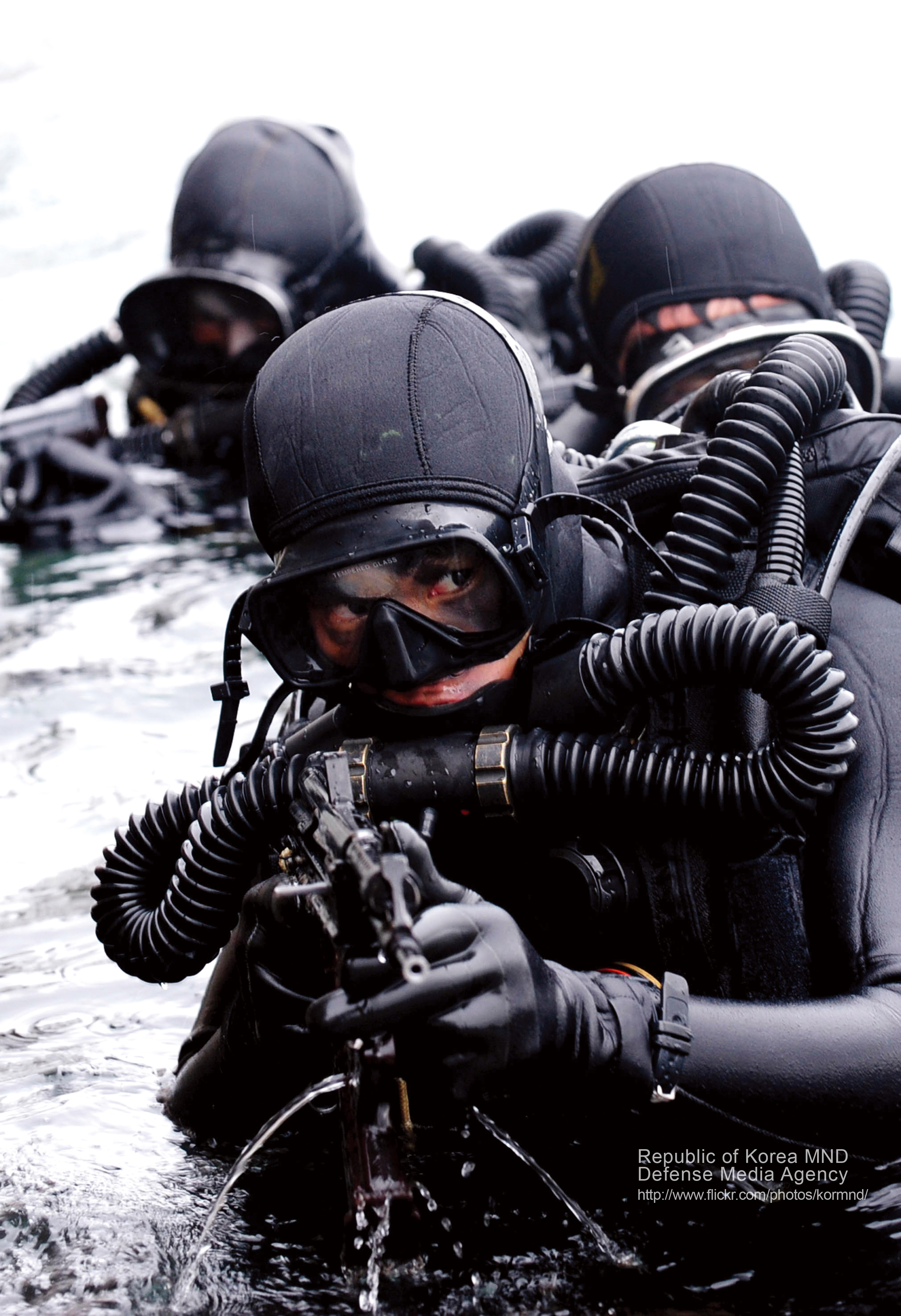
Republic of Korea Navy Special Warfare Flotilla members in an infiltration exercise

== See also ==
- List of military diving units
- Lionel Crabb – Royal Navy frogman and MI6 diver
- Military diving
- Underwater Demolition Team
