= List of American films of 1900 =

American films released in 1900 are from American Mutoscope and Biograph Company, Edison Film, Lubin, and Selig.

Title	Director	Cast	Genre	Notes
After Dark in Central Park				
Boarding School Girls' Pajama Parade				
Buffalo Bill's Wild West Parad				
Caught				
Clowns Spinning Hats				
Capture of Boer Battery by British	James H. White		Short documentary	
The Enchanted Drawing	J. Stuart Blackton			
Feeding Sea Lions		Paul Boyton		
How to Make a Fat Wife Out of Two Lean Ones			Comedy	
New Life Rescue				
New Morning Bath				
Searching Ruins on Broadway, Galveston, for Dead Bodies				
Sherlock Holmes Baffled				
The Tribulations of an Amateur Photographer				
Trouble in Hogan's Alley			Comedy	
Two Old Sparks			Short	Produced by Siegmund Lubin
The Wonder, Ching Ling Foo		Ching Ling Foo	Short	Produced by Siegmund Lubin
Watermelon Contest	James H. White		Short	

== See also ==
- 1900 in the United States
