= Searching Ruins on Broadway, Galveston, for Dead Bodies =

- Full film
- Produced by: Edison Studios
- Distributed by: Edison Manufacturing Company
- Release date: September 24, 1900
- Country: United States
- Languages: Silent film English intertitles

Searching Ruins on Broadway, Galveston, for Dead Bodies is a 1900 black-and-white silent film depicting the destruction caused by the Galveston hurricane on September 8, 1900. The film was produced by Edison Studios. It depicts laborers clearing debris searching for dead bodies. A body was found during the search.

== See also ==
- List of American films of 1900
- Galveston hurricane of 1900
