= John Spence (frogman) =

American diver for the United States Navy

John Pitts Spence (June 14, 1918 – October 29, 2013) was an American diver for the United States Navy and World War II veteran who is widely credited as the country's first combat frogman. Spence was the first enlisted man to be recruited into a clandestine group, operated by General William "Wild Bill" Donovan of the Office of Strategic Services (OSS), which would become known as the frogmen. The group was a predecessor of the present-day United States Navy SEALs.

The origin of the term "frogman" can be traced directly to John Spence. In an interview with maritime historian Erick Simmel, Spence explained that frogman first came into use while he was training in a green, waterproof suit. Spence recalled, "Someone saw me surfacing one day and yelled out, 'Hey, frogman!' The name stuck for all of us." Spence and the other men trained in underwater close combat techniques, demolition and stealth in order to destroy underwater emplacements and enemy ships during World War II. Spence trained under a medical student, Dr. Christian Lambertsen, who developed the U.S. Navy frogmen's rebreathers for underwater warfare.

Spence was initially sent to the United Kingdom after training. His original mission was to attack a German submarine base in France. However, Spence's original mission was cancelled for fear that the attack on the submarine base might accidentally alert Nazi Germany to the impending D-Day invasion of Normandy. Instead, Spence and several British commandos were secretly sent to France several times to rescue stranded airmen and meet with the French Resistance.

He was next sent to the Bahamas, where he trained combat swimmers to prepare for fighting against Japan in the Pacific Theater. Spence was soon deployed to the Pacific, where he served on the USS Wadsworth (DD-516). He manned a forward gun battery during the Battle of Iwo Jima in an effort to provide cover for U.S. combat swimmers. He also helmed the gun battery against kamikaze pilots during the long Battle of Okinawa in 1945.

Spence was unable to tell friends and family of his role in the frogmen until the late 1980s, when files on the group were finally declassified.

Spence remained with the United States Navy until his retirement in 1961. He worked as a systems testing engineer at the Lockheed Corporation after leaving the navy. He lived in the San Fernando Valley of Los Angeles and later resided in Oroville, California. He moved to Bend, Oregon, after the death of his first wife in the 2000s.

John Spence died at an elderly care facility in Bend, Oregon, on October 29, 2013, at the age of 95. He was survived by four daughters - Genevieve Ross, Yvonne Romano, Margo Kirkwood and Sharon Ogden.
