= Capture of Boer Battery by British =

- Produced by: James H. White
- Distributed by: Edison Manufacturing Company
- Release date: April 14, 1900
- Running time: 1 minute
- Country: United States
- Languages: Silent film English intertitles

Capture of Boer Battery by British is a black-and-white silent short docu-fiction film produced by James H. White for Edison Manufacturing Company in 1900. It is one minute in length and depicts the resistance of the Gordon Highlanders to the oncoming fire of the Boer's advance during the Boer War. It was filmed in West Orange, New Jersey USA and released April 14, 1900.

== See also ==
- List of American films of 1900
- Thomas Edison
- Boer War
- Silent film
