= The Chutes of San Francisco =

Amusement park in California, 1895–1911

Fillmore Chutes
- Previously known as Haight Street Chutes; Fulton Street Chutes
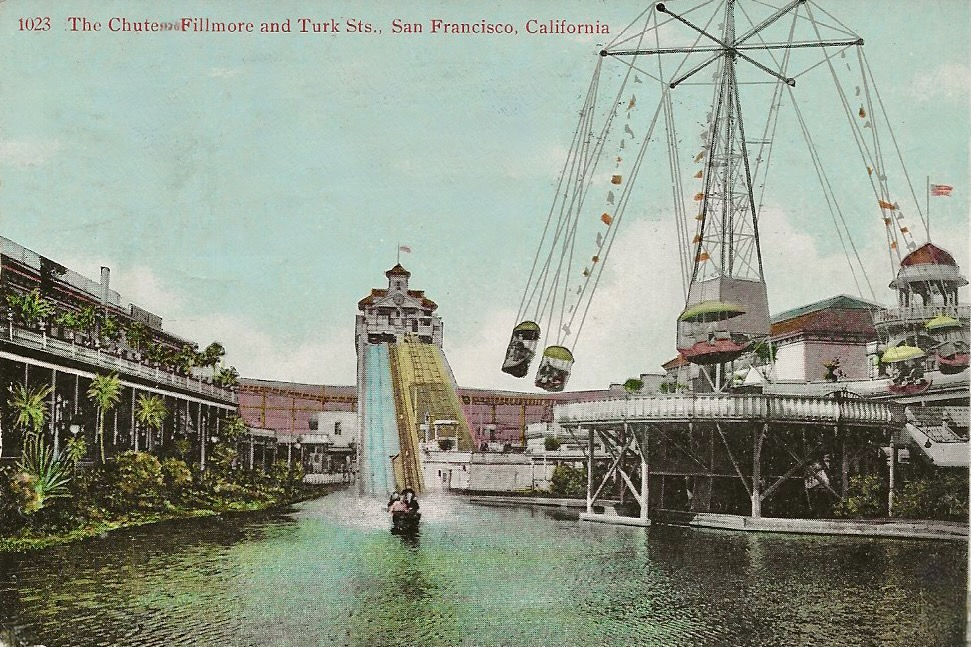
- The Chutes Fillmore and Turk Streets, San Francisco, California

- Location within San Francisco County Location within California
- Location: Fillmore Street, San Francisco, California, Haight Street, Fulton Street
- Coordinates: 37°46′48″N 122°25′54″W
- Status: Defunct
- Opened: 1895
- Closed: 1911
- Owner: Irving Ackerman
- Attendance: 4,000+

The Chutes of San Francisco (also known as the Fillmore Chutes) was an amusement park located on Fillmore Street, in the Fillmore District of San Francisco, California, bounded by Webster, Eddy, and Turk Streets.

== History ==
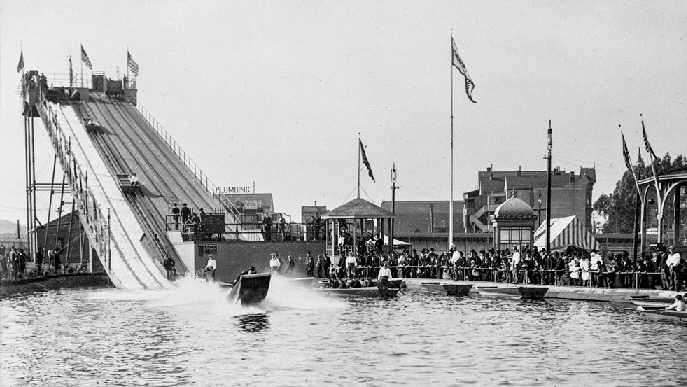
Haight Street chutes

In 1894, Paul Boyton conceived of the "Paul Boyton's Water Chutes" amusement ride in Chicago. Boyton began licensing the concept, and the attraction caught the attention of San Francisco. In 1895, the "Shoot the Chutes" opened to the public on Haight Street, a few blocks east of Golden Gate Park. Visitors boarded the boats stationed atop a tall structure, the ride included a 300-foot long descent down to a pool situated below. On March 16, 1902, the Haight Street Chutes closed. Following the closure of the Haight Street Chutes, the amusement moved to Fulton Street in the Inner Richmond District, opening in May. In 1909 the Fulton Chutes were closed, the property was sold to a developer. Irving Ackerman, the son of the original owner relocated the operation to Fillmore Street.

On May 29, 1911, a fire destroyed the Fillmore Chutes. The fire claimed the lives of three individuals and left seven others injured. The newly constructed Chutes Theater building, made of concrete, survived the fire. Following the destructive fire, the land was sold.

== See also ==
- List of defunct amusement parks
- Playland (San Francisco)
- List of amusement rides
