= Clowns Spinning Hats =

- Written by: Lubin Films
- Release date: April 7, 1900
- Country: United States
- Languages: Silent film English intertitles

Clowns Spinning Hats is a black-and-white silent film featuring clowns throwing hats back and forth to each other. It was written and produced by Lubin Films and released April 7, 1900.

== Plot ==
This thirty-three second film begins with men dressed in frilly, Victorian clown costumes and triangularly shaped hats. It includes two clowns dancing around and performing a few variations of stunts where they backflip to flip the triangular hat back on to the other performers’ head, they flick their head toward the other performer to stack the hat, and one puts a hat on their foot at backflips to throw it backwards onto the performer's head. Once one of the clowns has many stacked hats, they take them off their head and start juggling them onto each other's heads. They both end their performance with one of the clowns performing a few backflips with a hat on to toss it onto other clown's head.

== See also ==
- List of American films of 1900
- Lubin Studios
- Silent film
- Clown
