= Feeding Sea Lions =

- Production company: Lubin Studios
- Release date: March 10, 1900
- Running time: 75 ft
- Country: United States
- Languages: Silent film English intertitles

Feeding Sea Lions is a 1900 American silent short film featuring Paul Boyton feeding sea lions at his Sea Lion Park at Coney Island. Boyton is shown feeding the trained sea lions, twelve in number. The sea lions follow Boyton up the steps of the pool and then follow him back into the water. One of them steals food out of the basket. The film was made by Lubin Studios on March 10, 1900.

== Cast ==
- Paul Boyton
- Sea lions
