= USS Noxubee =

US Navy tanker

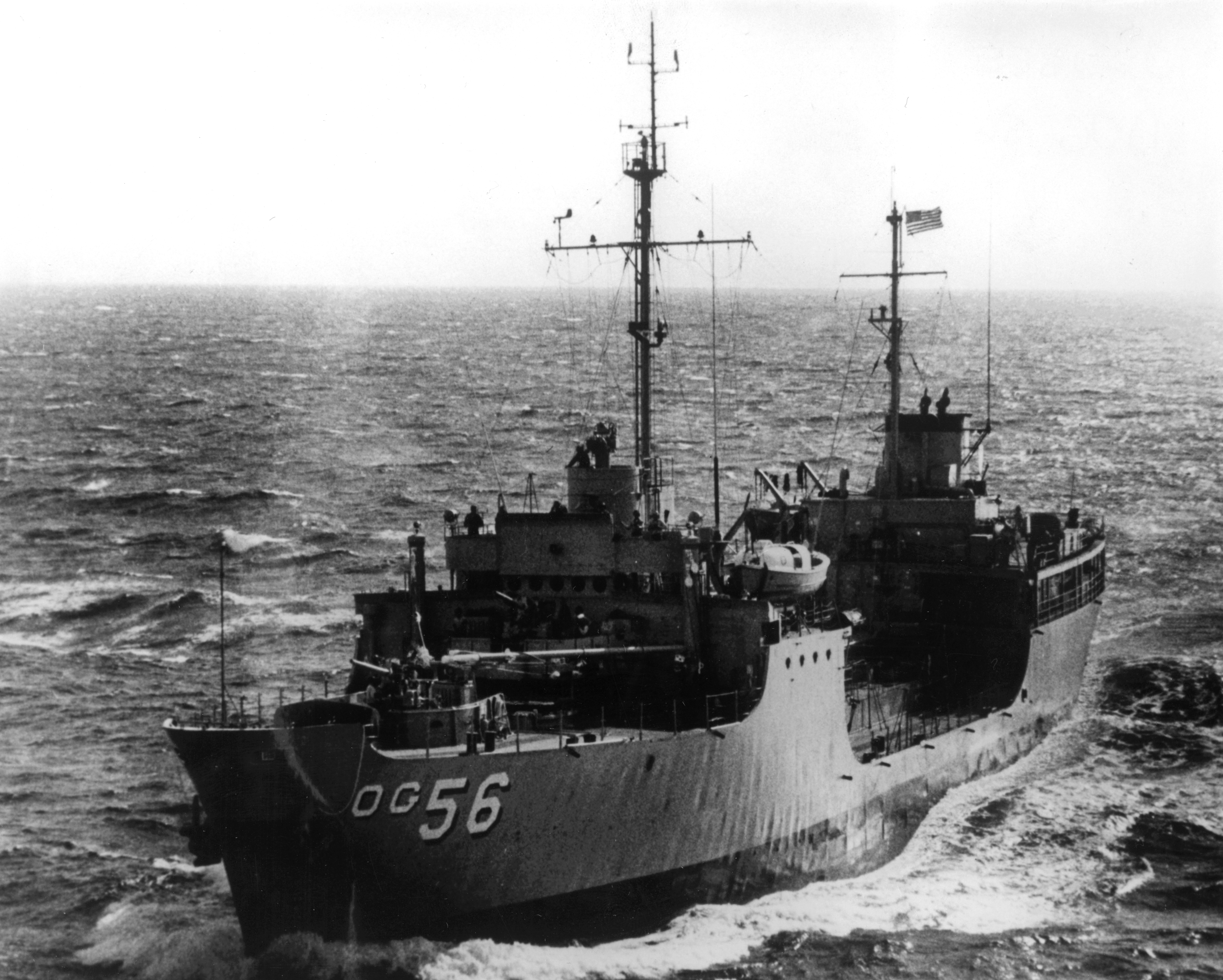

History

United States
- Name: USS Noxubee
- Namesake: Noxubee River in Mississippi
- Ordered: as T1-MT-M1 tanker hull
- Laid down: 17 November 1944
- Launched: 3 April 1945
- Commissioned: 19 October 1945
- Decommissioned: 6 March 1959
- In service: 10 September 1966
- Out of service: 1975
- Stricken: 1 July 1975
- Fate: Sold by MARAD for scrapping

General characteristics
- Class & type: Patapsco-class gasoline tanker
- Tonnage: 2,120 long tons deadweight (DWT)
- Displacement: 1,846 long tons (1,876 t) light; 4,130 long tons (4,196 t) full load
- Length: 310 ft 9 in (94.72 m)
- Beam: 48 ft 6 in (14.78 m)
- Draft: 15 ft 8 in (4.78 m)
- Propulsion: 4 × General Electric diesel engines, electric drive, twin shafts, 3,300 hp (2,461 kW)
- Speed: 14 knots (16 mph; 26 km/h)
- Complement: 131
- Armament: 4 × 3"/50 caliber guns; 12 × 20 mm AA guns

Service record
- Operations: Vietnam War
- Awards: 6 campaign stars; Meritorious Unit Commendation

USS Noxubee (AOG-56) was a Patapsco-class gasoline tanker acquired by the U.S. Navy for the task of transporting gasoline to warships in the fleet, and to remote Navy stations. She served in a commissioned status from 1945 to 1959, and 1965–1975. She was named for a river in Mississippi.

Noxubee was designed to replenish shore bases and ships. In addition she carried a limited quantity of light freight and provisions, and was capable of replenishing ships at sea. Although designated a gasoline tanker she frequently carried a split cargo of aviation gasoline, motor gasoline, diesel fuel, jet fuel, and Navy Special Fuel Oil.

== 1945–1959 ==
Noxubee was built by Cargill, Incorporated, Savage, Minnesota. Her keel was laid 17 November 1944. She was launched on 3 April 1945, under the sponsorship of Mrs. Wilbur F. Bagley of Minneapolis, Minnesota. Mrs. Bagley, representing the shipyard workers, was the wife of a veteran Cargill employee. Their son, Sergeant Wilbur L. Bagley, USMC had given his life for his country in the Solomon Islands.

Noxubee had a length of 310 feet, 10 inches; extreme beam, 48 feet 7 inches; displacement of 4,160 tons; draft, 15 feet, 0 inches; and a top speed of 14 knots. Her original complement was 8 officers and 116 men. When first commissioned she was armed with four 3-inch 50 caliber guns. Her cargo capacity was 680,000 gallons of petroleum products, approximately 2000 tons. Noxubee commissioned at Algiers, Louisiana, 19 October 1945.

Noxubee departed New Orleans on 6 November 1945, for shakedown training in the Gulf of Mexico operating out of Galveston, Texas. On 12 January 1946 she began the first of two round trips to Bermuda. On 26 February, she put to sea from Galena, Texas bound for Trinidad and Guantanamo Bay and then to a re-fueling rendezvous with fleet tugs Mosopelea and Hopi. On 2 April, she arrived at Bermuda for a three-day stay. Departing Bermuda she steamed north for Philadelphia, Norfolk, and then on to NS Argentia, Newfoundland, and back to Norfolk.

In the following months, Noxubee continued to operate out of Norfolk, transporting petroleum products to Argentia, Newfoundland; Goose Bay, Labrador; the Azores and Iceland. On 16 November 1947, Newport, Rhode Island, became her base of operations. From there she shuttled gasoline and oil to bases in Greenland and Newfoundland, and even made a few trips south to Texas and other Gulf States. From 6 March to 3 April 1950, Noxubee crossed the Atlantic from Newport with a liquid cargo for Casablanca, French Morocco, returning to Norfolk. A similar voyage was made from 23 January to 5 March 1951, with Naples, Italy added to her itinerary. After returning home, she made trips to Bermuda, Cuba, and to Newfoundland. She once again departed Norfolk 14 July, this time for duty with the Sixth Fleet in the Mediterranean. Noxubee was based in Tripoli, Libya and replenished units of the Sixth Fleet in ports of Italy, France, Greece, Algiers and Malta. She departed Tripoli on 20 April 1952 and arrived in New York on 4 May.

Following a period of upkeep in the Norfolk and Boston Naval Shipyards, Noxubee was based at Newport until 12 March 1953, when she again sailed to join the Sixth Fleet. She operated out of Tripoli and traveled to the principal Mediterranean ports visited by the Sixth Fleet. Noxubee departed Marseilles, France on 28 September, and returned to Norfolk 14 October.

Noxubee then spent nearly four months at Newport. She sailed as replenishment station ship for a short-range craft convoy en route to the Azores via Bermuda. She returned to Newport on 26 March 1954, and was overhauled in the Boston Naval Shipyard from 29 April to 1 July 1954. She again departed Newport 3 September, to serve with the Sixth Fleet. Noxubee was based at Tripoli until 24 January 1955, when she departed Gibraltar for Newport on 5 February. After a training cruise to Cuba and Puerto Rico, she again departed Newport 19 August, for another tour in the Mediterranean, serving there until 3 December.

Noxubee arrived in Newport from Gibraltar on 14 December 1955. After traveling 23,775 miles in 1955, she was overhauled in the Boston Naval Shipyard and on 21 May 1956, she again put to sea, bound for Tripoli, Libya, to serve Sixth Fleet and NATO Fleet units in the Mediterranean. She returned home to Newport on 29 October. Noxubee departed Newport on 6 May 1957 for duty as station tanker with a convoy of minesweepers bound for the Azores. She returned on 6 June, was overhauled in the Boston Naval Shipyard, then made a refresher training cruise to Guantanamo Bay, Cuba.

Noxubee returned north to Newport on 30 March 1958, ranging south to Bermuda and north to Maine before she again sailed from Newport on 8 September with a convoy en route via Bermuda to the Azores, returning 29 September. Noxubee departed 2 January 1959 for Green Cove Springs, Florida and deactivation. She was decommissioned on 6 March 1959, and was assigned to the Florida Group, U.S. Atlantic Reserve Fleet until her name was struck from the Navy List on 1 July 1960. Noxubee was transferred to the Maritime Administration until placed on the Navy List for activation in 1965.

== 1965–1970 ==
On 10 September 1966, following a seven-month outfitting and modernization period at Baltimore, Noxubee was recommissioned at Norfolk Naval Shipyard, LT Howard Pabst commanding. One month later she sailed for Pearl Harbor, Hawaii via the Panama Canal as a unit of Service Squadron Five.

Following refresher training at Pearl Harbor, Noxubee deployed to the western Pacific on 9 March 1967. During that deployment she supported advanced fuel bases along the coast of I Corps, South Vietnam. On 2 August 1967, Noxubee departed Da Nang for Sasebo and Yokosuka, Japan. During her return trip to Pearl Harbor Noxubee was diverted to Wake Island to assist in the salvage of a grounded civilian tanker. She finally arrived at Pearl Harbor on 22 September 1967. While conducting a training cruise off the coast of Oahu on 24 November, Noxubee spotted and rescued the sole survivor of a fishing boat accident.

On 17 April 1968, Noxubee departed Hawaii for her second WESTPAC cruise. Noxubee headed directly for Vietnam for three months of continuous operations. In August Noxubee received the Battle Efficiency Pennant for fiscal year 1968. On 28 October, Noxubee came under enemy artillery fire while anchored off Cửa Việt, escaping unharmed. During this deployment Noxubee set the all-time record for AOGs by pumping 20 million gallons of petroleum products and earning a Meritorious Unit Commendation. Noxubee returned to Pearl Harbor in December 1968.

Following six months of upkeep and training Noxubee again departed Pearl Harbor for Vietnam on 2 June 1969 with LT D. E. Cass commanding. Operating out of Da Nang, she made frequent trips to Sa Huynh, Tan My and Cửa Việt. On 9 September 1969 Noxubee was mined by enemy swimmers while anchored at Cửa Việt. The explosion created a three by five-foot hole in her hull but the crew suffered no casualties. Temporary repairs were quickly accomplished at Da Nang and she was back on station in less than a week. At the end of the month Noxubee traveled to Subic Bay for permanent repairs. In addition to Subic Bay, Noxubee also visited Hong Kong and Sasebo, Japan during this deployment. She returned to Pearl Harbor on 6 February 1970.

== 1970–1975 ==
Noxubee departed Pearl Harbor on 18 May 1970 for her new homeport at Little Creek, Virginia and duty with Service Squadron Eight. The trip to the east coast included stops at Long Beach, California, Acapulco, Mexico, and the Panama Canal. Noxubee deployed for five months in the Mediterranean on 28 December 1970 still under the command of LCDR Cass. Her duties centered around Amphibious Task Force 61 with occasional replenishments of other Sixth Fleet ships. She also accomplished one month's surveillance of the Soviet Union Mediterranean Fleet.

Upon return to Little Creek Noxubee undertook a major overhaul at the Brambleton plant of Norfolk Shipbuilding and Dry Dock Company. After completion of the overhaul and refresher training, Noxubee again deployed for the Mediterranean. Noxubee refueled ships ranging from LPH to PG types, pumping some 3,881,078 gallons of fuel. In May and July, the ship participated in exercises Dawn Patrol and National Week. Although primarily assigned to service Amphibious Task Force 61, Noxubee re-fueled destroyers throughout the Mediterranean. Port visits included Rota and Barcelona, Spain; Naples, Italy; Athens, Corfu, and Thera, Greece and the French Riviera. Noxubee returned to Little Creek on 14 August.

After returning home the ship provided refueling services to units of the Mine Force off Charleston, South Carolina. On two separate occasions during December 1972 Noxubee was assigned to refuel destroyers on Atlantic Ocean station. During the first half of 1973 Noxubee underwent an RAV (Restricted Availability Period) during which many repairs were made. Upon completion of the RAV the ship conducted underway replenishment operations off the Eastern Coast of the U.S., as well as a refresher training period. These operations included the refueling of four destroyers and ten minesweepers

In 1973, LT Michael Mullen, USN assumed command of Noxubee. Mullen would eventually attain the rank of Admiral, would eventually become Chief of Naval Operations and ultimately the US military's senior ranking officer as Chairman of the Joint Chiefs of Staff. During Mullen's command, Noxubee collided with a buoy in the Chesapeake. On 6 June 1973, Noxubee sailed for operations with the Sixth Fleet. During this cruise Noxubee provided support for 55 ships of three nations. Port visits included Istanbul and İzmir Turkey, Athens, Corfu, and Thera, Greece and Naples, Italy. Noxubee returned to Little Creek in November. From December 1973, to May 1974, Noxubee underwent an RAV period.

After a training cruise to Bermuda and the Bahamas, Noxubee departed for the Mediterranean on 4 October 1974 for her final deployment to the Sixth Fleet. Noxubee visited 13 foreign ports and transferred over 5 million gallons of fuel while traveling over 17,000 miles. On 11 April 1975, Noxubee returned to Little Creek, Virginia for the last time.

Over the next ten weeks Noxubee was stripped of all salvageable gear and prepared for decommissioning. The decommissioning ceremony was held at Pier 12 Naval Amphibious Base Little Creek, Virginia. At 1400 hours 1 July 1975, Noxubee was officially stricken from the list of active US Naval Ships.

== Military awards and honors ==
Noxubee was awarded six campaign stars for Vietnam War service:

- Vietnam Counteroffensive – Phase II
- Vietnam Counteroffensive – Phase III
- Vietnam Counteroffensive – Phase IV
- Vietnam Counteroffensive – Phase V
- Vietnam Summer-Fall 1969
- Vietnam Winter-Spring 1970

Noxubee’s crew was eligible for the following medals, ribbons, and commendations (shown in order of precedence):

- Combat Action Ribbon (28 Oct.1968 and 9 Sept. 1969)
- Navy Meritorious Unit Commendation
- Battle "E" Ribbon
- American Campaign Medal
- World War II Victory Medal
- Navy Occupation Service Medal (with Europe Clasp)
- National Defense Service Medal
- Vietnam Service Medal (6)
- Republic of Vietnam Meritorious Unit Commendation (5)
- Republic of Vietnam Campaign Medal
