= Paul Boyton =

American stunt performer (1848–1924)

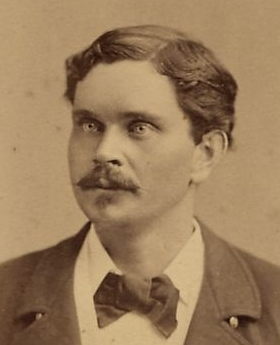
- Born: 29 June 1848; Dublin, Ireland
- Died: 18 April 1924 (aged 75); New York City, United States
- Education: Saint Francis University
- Occupation: Showman
- Years active: c. 1870s – 1902
- Notable work: Sea Lion Park, Coney Island; Chutes Park, San Francisco

Paul Boyton (often misspelled Boynton; 29 June 1848 – 18 April 1924), known as the Fearless Frogman, was a showman and adventurer some credit as having spurred worldwide interest in water sports as a hobby, particularly open-water swimming. Boyton is best known for his water stunts that captivated the world, including crossing the English Channel in a novel rubber suit that functioned similarly to a kayak. As the founder of Sea Lion Park in 1895, Boyton is also known as the originator of the first modern amusement park—a permanent, fenced-in enclosure charging admission at the gate.

== Early life and education ==
Paul Boyton was born on 29 June 1848 in Dublin, Ireland, to Terrance and Marie Boyton, and grew up in Pennsylvania. Boyton learned to swim at a young age in Pittsburgh, and used his skills to save his friends from drowning. He attended Saint Francis University, Loretto, Pennsylvania. He served as a sailor for the Union in the American Civil War, fought against Maximilian I of Mexico during the fall of his empire, and fought with the French franc-tireurs during the Franco-Prussian War. Boyton then became head of the New Jersey Life-Saving Service, where he reduced the number of drownings per year from twenty to none. Later in his life, he referred to himself as "Captain Boyton", but there is no evidence that he ever was one.

Boyton was very arrogant. One time, a man he saved from drowning gave him a fifty cent note. However, he handed forty-nine cents back and said "I could not think of taking a cent more than your life is worth".

== Expeditions ==
=== Merriman life-saving suit exhibitions ===
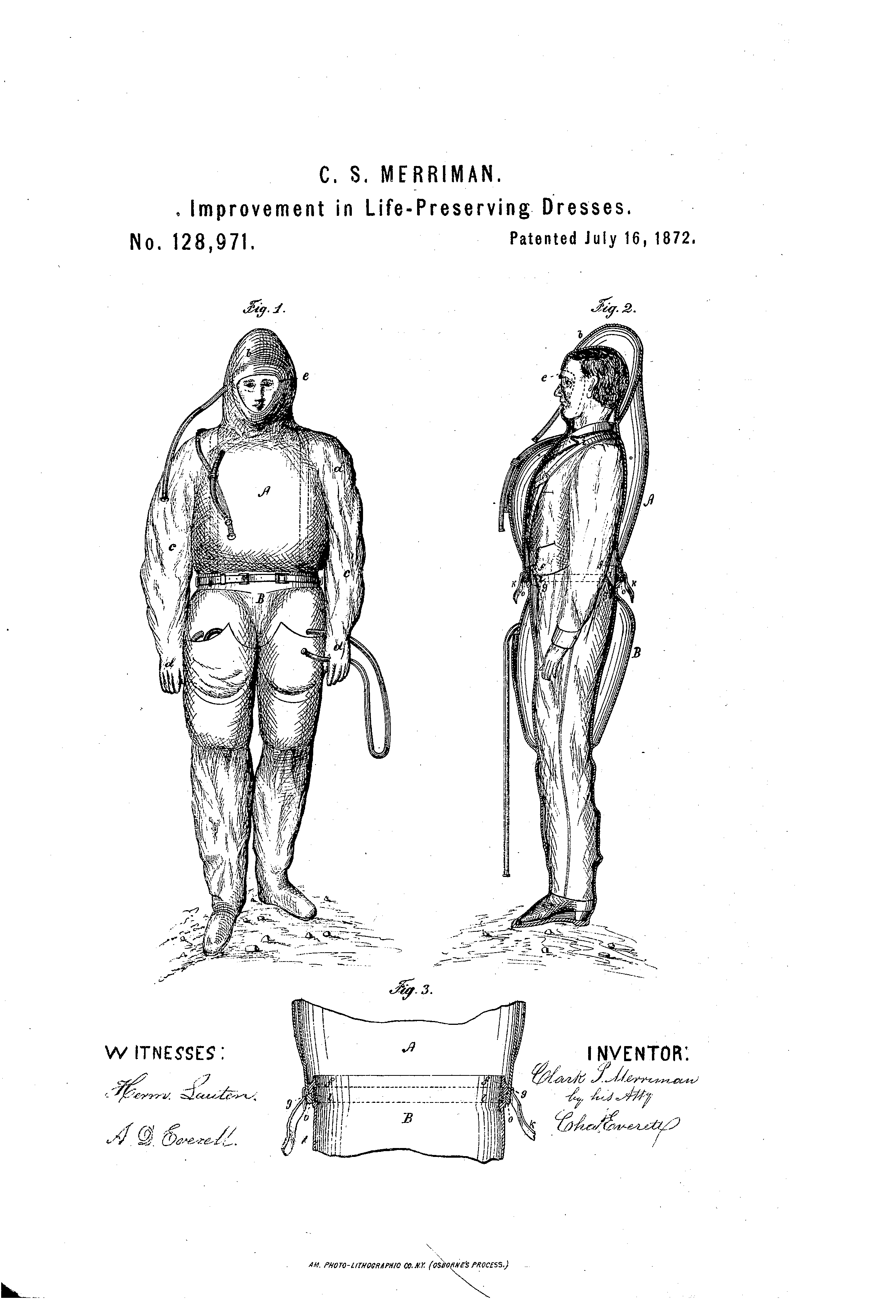
Patent diagram of C. S. Merriman's suit

While in Atlantic City, Jersey, Boyton began toying with a rubber suit invented by Clark S. Merriman as a life-saving device for steamship passengers. This first immersion suit, which would become Boyton's trademark, was essentially a pair of rubber pants and shirt cinched tight at the waist. Within the suit were air pockets the wearer could inflate at will using tubes. Similar to modern-day drysuits, the suit also kept its wearer dry. This essentially allowed the wearer to float on his back, using a double-sided paddle to propel himself, feet-forward. The suit had a rubber bag attached, which was intended to be used as storage for survival essentials such as food and water. A small sail could also be attached to the foot.

==== Early exhibitions ====
Initially, there was little public interest in the suit. With the hope to improve this, Boyton wanted to paddle from 250 miles off the coast of New York onto the shore, but could not find a single ship's captain that would take him out. Undeterred, Merriman invited Boyton to Ireland, where Boyton exhibited the suit to increase its publicity. Boyton once again intended to swim to shore from 200 miles out at sea, but this time, Boyton did not tell the captain of his intentions, and so the captain was furious when he found Boyton on the side of the ship with his suit on about to jump in the water. Despite this, Boyton managed to convince the captain to drop him 2.5 miles out, where from Boyton paddled for 15 hours against the violent wind and waves of the storm to the Irish coast. By the time he got to shore, Boyton had his vision seriously impaired by the salt water, and thanked the "great pilot above", before sending a telegram to the captain that dropped him off, and the New York Herald. Word had already spread about what he was doing, and the Cork Examiner called the exploit the "sensation of the day". Boyton's following shows in Queenstown Harbour and around Dublin were extremely popular, so much so that he was sent an invitation to meet Queen Victoria and Princess Beatrice on a yacht near the Isle of Wight, which he accepted. By the time Boyton left Dublin, the newspapers estimated that over 100,000 people had attended his shows. During the Christmas of 1874, Boyton sent a message to The Times, where he used the recent sinking of the Cospatrick as an example of why Merriman's suit could save lives. Boyton's final exhibition before the channel crossing, was to perform with the suit in the River Thames.

==== Channel crossing ====
Boyton's toughest swim in the suit was a channel crossing. Before his first attempt, Queen Victoria and the American Minister General Schenck telegraphed Boyton to ask whether the wind was for or against him. On 10 April at 15:20, Boyton entered the water and began paddling himself feet first to France. The Z-shaped navigation course was handled by the French pilot François Méquin. During the swim, Boyton made use of the sail attached to the suit, which allowed the wind to carry him some of the way. Aboard the boat following Boyton were reporters from the Standard, The Observer, The Illustrated London News, The Times, Bell's Life, the New York Herald, The Telegraph, The Daily News and The Graphic. When the weather got tough, and night loomed, Méquin demanded that the attempt be abandoned. Upon boarding the boat, Boyton was around 6 miles from Cap Gris-Nez.

Boyton entered the water at Cap Gris-Nez for his second attempt on 28 May at 03:00, accompanied by the Prince Ernest and captained by Edward Dane. By 06:00, Boyton was 5 miles from the French coast, and at 11:45, he was halfway. At 18:30, Boyton was 4 miles from Dover, and by 02:30, he had laded at Fan Bay, near the Port of Dover. He completed the swim in around 23 1/2 hours. After the swim, Boyton's was looked after by two doctors, and he was pronounced well enough to receive the congratulations of the nation. Boyton was sent telegrams by Queen Victoria, President Grant and Albert Edward (then Prince of Wales) congratulating him. The swim was subsequently reported on by the Illustrated Sporting and Dramatic News.

==== Further exhibitions ====
Before leaving England, Boyton umpired a race from Putney to Hammersmith down the Thames, where all the competitors were paddling in Merriman's suits. The competition was won by Mr. Whalley. On 23 August, Boyton performed one final time in England with the suit at Folkestone Harbour, before leaving for Germany.

Boyton made numerous further expeditions in this suit, swimming up and down rivers across America and Europe to publicize its uses. Boyton would tow a small boat behind him in which he carried his supplies and personal possessions, and sometimes invited newspaper reporters to accompany him. A canny publicist, Boyton's arrival in small river towns was often heralded by great fanfare. Among his exploits were: paddled Rhine 430 miles (1875); Alton, Ill. to St. Louis, Mo. on the Mississippi (1876) and same year Bayou Goula to New Orleans, 100 miles in 24 hours; 400 miles on the Danube in six days (1876); navigated all important rivers of the continent, passed through canals of Venice and crossed the straits of Gibraltar; returned to the U.S. and floated from Oil City, Pa. to the Gulf of Mexico—2,342 miles in 80 days. In September 1879, professional swimmer Matthew Webb competed for the Championship of the World against Paul Boyton. Webb won but was accused of cheating and so the prize money was withheld. His longest voyage was in 1881 when he started at Glendive, Mont. and ended at St. Louis, Mo., 1,675 miles.

=== Rivalry with Matthew Webb ===
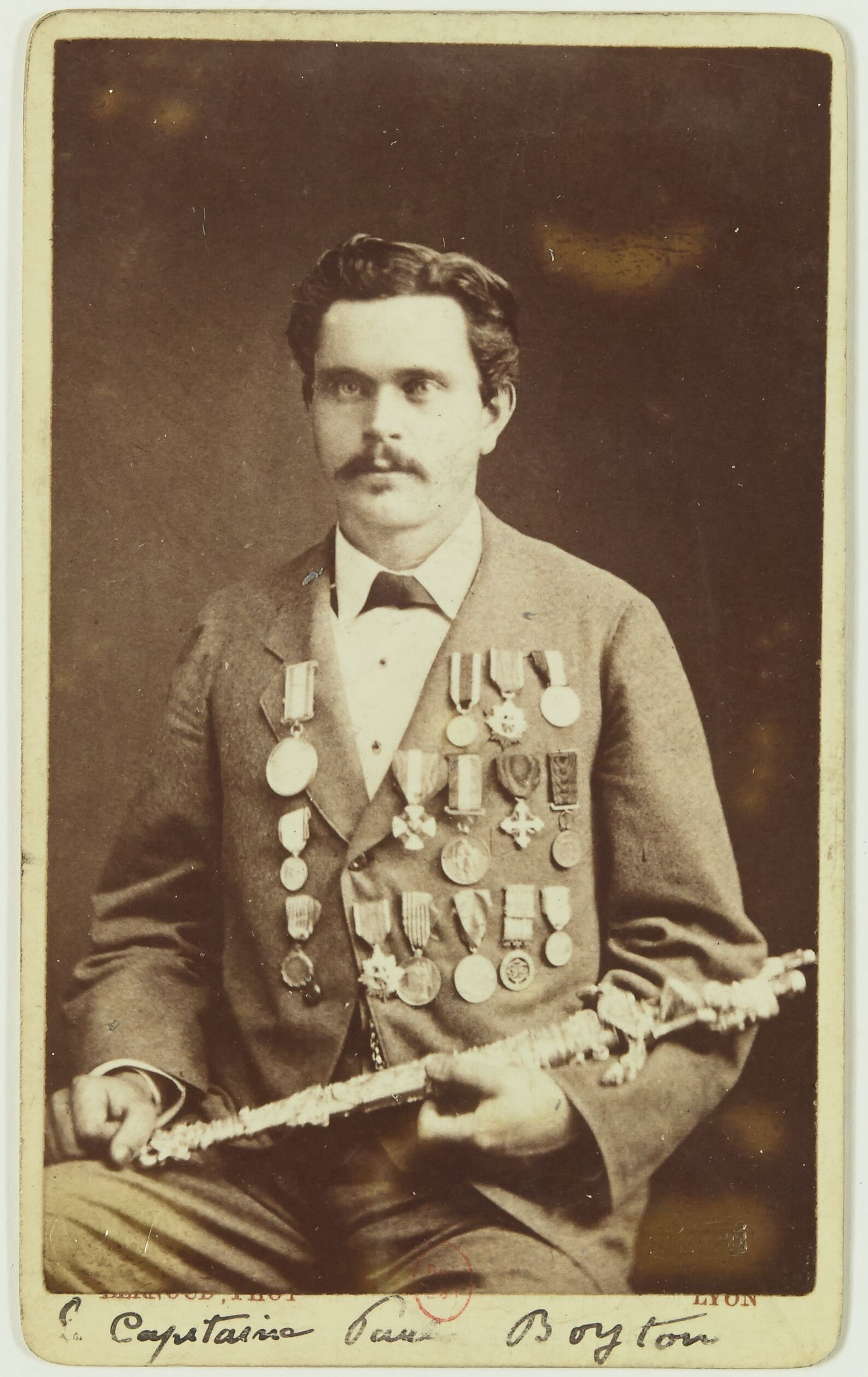
A 19th century photograph of Boyton, by Alphonse Bernoud of Lyon

On 25 August 1875, Matthew Webb became the first person to swim across the English Channel without any artificial aid. Although Boyton crossed the channel in Merriman's suit, while Webb did it in only his red swimming trunks, sporting and stunting achievements were compared more often at the time, which led to the public and Webb and Boyton considering themselves as rivals.

Five years later, in 1880, both Boyton and Webb happened to be near Newport beach. They both agreed to a public race, and deposited $1,000 each into the prize pool. Newport casino owner James Garden Bennett also contributed $1,000 which brought the total prize pool to $3,000. Two white buoys were placed half a mile apart, with Webb tasked with swimming around them twenty times in regular swimming trunks, and Boyton tasked with swimming around them twenty-five times with his suit. Formal rule agreements were signed by both, and the swim commenced. There was a large crowd gathered on the beach, and Boyton got off to a very fast start. Unfortunately for Webb, he got a severe cramp which ended his race, while Boyton simply cruised to the finish.

Webb quickly challenged Boyton to a rematch, which he accepted. Their second race took place at Nantasket Beach, and was advertised as the "Championship of the world". Since fanfare was even greater on their second meeting, the prize pool was even higher at $4,000. In this race, Boyton had to travel between three buoys, while Webb only had to travel between two. After the race was postponed several times, it eventually went ahead on September 6. The details of the race are unclear, but the referee refused to declare a winner and later accused Webb of cheating by swimming to shore and running across the beach. Webb, backed up by Hartley defended himself, and it was later found out that the referee was Boyton's fiancée's dad, indicating that he was probably biased.

Boyton challenged Webb again, via a letter to the New York Herald that offered him even greater odds. However Webb did not reply.

== Later showmanship ==
In 1885, Boyton was involved in the fatal leap from Brooklyn Bridge of Robert Emmet Odlum, brother of women's rights activist Charlotte Odlum Smith. Catherine Odlum, mother of Robert and Charlotte, blamed Boyton for her son's death. Boyton wrote Mrs. Odlum a letter disclaiming responsibility, which he also published in The New York Times and other periodicals. Mrs. Odlum subsequently traveled to New York City to see Boyton. According to her account, Boyton sent two men to see her who claimed to be a lawyer and a judge, and who warned her not to say anything against Boyton to avoid prosecution for slander. Catherine Odlum claimed in the biography she wrote of her son that Boyton hid or destroyed letters and telegrams from himself to Robert Odlum urging him to travel to New York and make the Brooklyn Bridge jump.

After the incident, Boyton left New York City and formed an aquatic circus, touring as the main act in P. T. Barnum's circus during 1887. He settled in Chicago in 1888 and noted the success of the attractions Midway at Chicago's Columbian Exposition of 1892. Building on this, in 1894, he opened the first "permanent" amusement park (Paul Boyton's Water Chutes) in Chicago, which was also the first park of any type to charge an admission. The following year, he bought 16 acres (65,000 m^{2}) of land and opened the Sea Lion Park on Coney Island in 1895. He fenced the property and charged admission, an innovation at the time. It would later become Coney Island Amusement Park. Boyton and his sea lions also performed in silent films including Feeding Sea Lions.

In 1902, Boyton sold Sea Lion Park to Frederic Thompson and Elmer "Skip" Dundy, who redesigned the park and renamed it Luna Park, the first of many of that name to come. Paul Boyton's Water Chutes was permanently closed in 1908, a casualty of increased competition from White City amusement parks, Electric Parks, and Luna Parks that arose in the dozen-plus years after the World's Columbian Exposition.

Boyton's rubber suit was featured by Jules Verne in Tribulations of a Chinaman in China as a life saver for the hero and his three companions.

Boyton is a member of the International Swimming Hall of Fame.

== Sources ==
- Watson, Kathy (2001). The crossing: the glorious tragedy of the first man to swim the English channel. 375 Hudson Street, New York: G. P. Putnam's Sons. ISBN 1-58542-109-X.
- Dolphin (1875). The Channel Feats of Captain Webb and Captain Boyton. 160A, Fleet Street, London: Dean & Son.

== See also ==
- James Creelman
- List of members of the International Swimming Hall of Fame
- The Chutes of San Francisco
