= J. Randall Brown =

American mentalist (1851–1926)

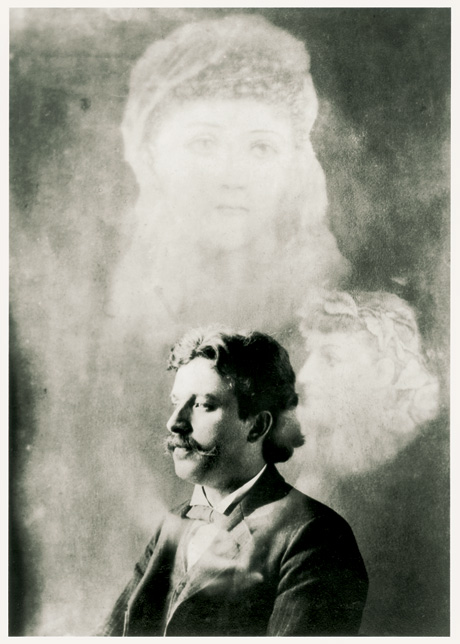
- Born: October 28, 1851; Saint Louis, Missouri
- Died: July 3, 1926 (aged 74); Minneapolis, Minnesota
- Occupation: Mentalist
- Years active: 19th century
- Known for: Muscle reading

John Randall Brown (October 28, 1851 – July 3, 1926) was an American mentalist of the Victorian era, and was one of the first nationally popular mentalists of his age. By some accounts, Brown was the first to publicly perform a mind-reading act in the United States, in 1873. He was born in Saint Louis, Missouri.

== Life ==
As a young man, Brown worked in his family's machine shop. On August 5, 1873, Brown gave a demonstration of his ability to find objects hidden in a room to an informal audience in a saloon that so impressed the onlookers he shortly thereafter was giving public demonstration of his powers. Brown himself claimed he was reading his subjects' minds, though it's clear Brown was in actuality employed a groundbreaking muscle reading technique to get subjects to lead him to the objects. His public demonstrations were so successful and remunerative that by January 1874, Brown had quit his job in the machine shop and launched a career as a performer.

Brown was quite famous in the 1870s, attracting national attention with his feats. He was described in one article as holding the American people "by the nape of the neck, controlling the press as absolutely as a Napoleon or a Czar". Among people living through the progress and wonders of the Second Industrial Revolution, Brown helped create the popular impression that telepathy was a real skill that mankind was on the cusp of developing.

Several scientific institutions were interested in Brown's abilities and he was investigated by a number of scientific authorities, including doctors at Yale University, Rush Medical College, and the University of Michigan. These doctors' findings supported Brown's claims that he was able to read minds, and Brown incorporated copy from their findings into his promotional posters.

Brown was the subject of some investigation and journalism by American neurologist George M. Beard. In 1874, Beard - irritated that Brown's abilities enjoyed so much excitement and attention in the scientific community - tested and examined Brown's claims in a New Haven music hall and (correctly) deduced that Brown's abilities were in fact due to muscle reading and not "thought transference" as Brown himself claimed. Beard also wrote a series of journalistic articles to this effect, but these were largely ignored by popular audiences and by his scientific peers.

Brown continued performing until 1923, at which time he retired to Minneapolis, taking jobs around the area as a printer and photographer. He died three years later in 1926.

Several of Brown's stage assistants, such as Washington Irving Bishop, took the information they gleaned in Brown's employ and went on to profitable solo careers of their own in the art.

== Act ==
Brown was an early proponent of muscle reading, sometimes called "contact mind reading" or "Cumberlandism" after Stuart Cumberland, although Brown's act predated Cumberland's, and Brown himself is often credited with starting the vogue for the art. The very term "muscle reading" was coined in a series of articles about Brown's abilities.

Brown's shows also combined elements of the willing game and traditional séances. One of his trademark acts was the one in which he instructed the audience that while he was out of the room they were to select one of their own to be an imaginary murderer, one the victim, and something in the room to be the murder weapon. When they were done, Brown would return, take hold of one audience member by the wrist and physically lead that person to all three selections - "reading" the muscle resistance (or lack thereof) the audience member would give as he led them about the room. Much of his act consisted of variations on finding things he could not possibly know the location of. While an expert muscle reader, Brown still described this trick to his audience as "mind reading".
