= William F. Barrett =

English physicist and parapsychologist (1844–1925)

Sir William F. Barrett
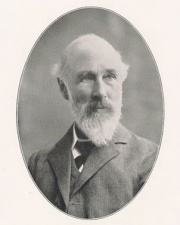
- Barrett in the 1890s
- Born: William Fletcher Barrett; 10 February 1844; Kingston, Colony of Jamaica
- Died: 26 May 1925 (aged 81); London, England, UK
- Spouse: Florence Barrett (m. 1916)
- Relatives: Rosa Mary Barrett (sister)

Sir William Fletcher Barrett (10 February 1844 – 26 May 1925) was an English physicist and parapsychologist.

== Life ==
Barrett was born on 10 February 1844 in Kingston, Colony of Jamaica (present-day Jamaica) to The Rev William Garland Barrett (1812–1865) and Martha Barrett (née Fletcher; c. 1811–1893). Barrett's father was a Congregational Minister and missionary for the London Missionary Society, who ran a station on the Underground Railway. One of four surviving children, Barrett was the older brother of Rosa Mary Barrett, a philanthropist, child care reformer and suffragist.

The family returned to their native England in Royston, Hertfordshire in 1848. In 1855 they moved to Manchester and Barrett was then educated at Old Trafford Grammar School. Barrett then took chemistry and physics at the Royal College of Chemistry and then became the science master at the London International College (1867–9) before becoming assistant to John Tyndall at the Royal Institution (1863–1866). He then taught at the Royal School of Naval Architecture.

In 1873 he became Professor of Experimental Physics at the Royal College of Science for Ireland. From the early 1880s he lived with his mother, sister, and two live-in servants in a residence at Kingstown (now Dún Laoghaire). Barrett discovered Stalloy (see Permalloy), a silicon-iron alloy used in electrical engineering and also did a lot of work on sensitive flames and their uses in acoustic demonstrations. During his studies of metals and their properties, Barrett worked with W. Brown and R. A. Hadfield. He also discovered the shortening of nickel through magnetisation in 1882.

When Barrett developed cataracts in his later years, he also began to study biology with a series of experiments designed to locate and successfully analyze causative agents within the eyes. The result of these experiments was a machine called the entoptiscope. He was elected a Fellow of the Royal Society in June 1899 and was also a fellow of the Royal Society of Edinburgh and the Royal Dublin Society. He was knighted in 1912.

Barrett's last book, Christian Science: An Examination of the Religion of Health was completed and published after his death in 1926 by his sister Rosa M. Barrett.

== Psychical research ==
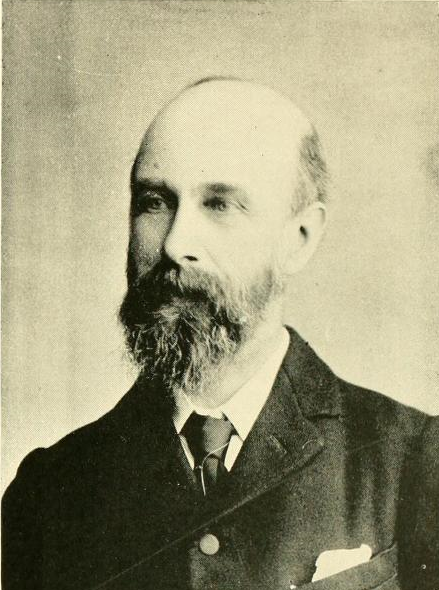
Barrett

Barrett became interested in the paranormal in the 1860s after having an experience with mesmerism. Barrett believed that he had been witness to thought transference and by the 1870s he was investigating poltergeists. In September 1876 Barrett published a paper outlining the result of these investigations and by 1881 he had published preliminary accounts of his additional experiments with thought transference in the journal Nature. The publication caused controversy and in the wake of this Barrett decided to found a society of like-minded individuals to help further his research. Barrett held conference between 5–6 January 1882 in London. In February the Society for Psychical Research (SPR) was formed.

Barrett was a Christian and spiritualist member of the SPR. Although he had founded the society, Barrett was only truly active for a year, and in 1884 founded the American Society for Psychical Research. He became president of the society in 1904 and continued to submit articles to their journal. From 1908–14 Barrett was active in the Dublin Section of the Society for Psychical Research, a group which attracted many important members including Sir John Pentland Mahaffy, T.W. Rolleston, Sir Archibald Geikie, and Lady Augusta Gregory.

In the late 19th century the Creery Sisters (Mary, Alice, Maud, Kathleen, and Emily) were tested by Barrett and other members of the SPR who believed them to have genuine psychic ability, however, the sisters later confessed to fraud by describing their method of signal codes that they had utilized. Barrett and the other members of the SPR such as Edmund Gurney and Frederic W. H. Myers had been easily duped.

As a believer in telepathy, Barrett denounced the muscle reading of Stuart Cumberland and other magicians as "pseudo" thought readers.

Barrett helped to publish Frederick Bligh Bond's book Gate of Remembrance (1918) which was based on alleged psychical excavations at Glastonbury Abbey. Barrett endorsed the claims of the book and testified to Bond's sincerity. However, professional archaeologists and skeptics have found Bond's claims dubious.

In 1919, Barrett wrote the introduction to medium Hester Dowden's book Voices from the Void.

== Dowsing ==
Barrett held a special interest in divining rods and in 1897 and 1900 he published two articles on the subject in Proceedings of the SPR. He co-authored the book The Divining-Rod (1926), with Theodore Besterman.

Barrett rejected any physical theory for dowsing such as radiation. He concluded that the ideomotor response was responsible for the movement of the rod but in some cases the dowser's unconscious could pick up information by clairvoyance.

== Reception ==
Barrett has drawn criticism from researchers and skeptics as being overly credulous for endorsing spiritualist mediums and not detecting trickery that occurred in the séance room. For example, author Ronald Pearsall wrote that Barrett was duped into believing spiritualism by mediumship trickery.

Skeptic Edward Clodd criticized Barrett as being an incompetent researcher to detect fraud and claimed his spiritualist beliefs were based on magical thinking and primitive superstition. Another skeptic Joseph McCabe wrote that Barrett "talks nonsense of which he ought to be ashamed" as he had poor understanding of conjuring tricks and failed to detect the fraud of the medium Kathleen Goligher.

Psychical researcher Helen de G. Verrall gave Barrett's book Psychical Research a positive review describing it as a "clear, careful account of some of main achievements of psychical research by one who has himself taken part in these achievements and speaks to a large extent from personal knowledge and observation." However, in the British Medical Journal the book was criticized for ignoring critical work on the subject and being "a negative assault on scientific method generally".

== Personal life ==
In 1916, Barrett married the obstetric and gynaecological surgeon Florence Barrett.

On 26 May 1925, Barrett died suddenly of heart failure at his London home aged 81.

== Bibliography ==
- Practical Physics: An Introductory Handbook for the Physical Laboratory. (1892) London: Percival & Co.
- On the Threshold of a New World of Thought: An Examination of the Phenomena of Spiritualism. (1908) London: Kegan Paul, Trench, Trübner & Co.
- Psychical Research. (1911) New York: Henry Holt & Co.
- Swedenborg: The Savant and the Seer. (1912) London: Watkins.
- On the Threshold of the Unseen: An Examination of the Phenomena of Spiritualism and of the Evidence for Survival After Death. (1917) London: Kegan Paul, Trench, Trübner & Co. (Volltext)
- The Divining Rod: An Experimental and Psychological Investigation. [with Theodore Besterman] (1926) London: Methuen & Co.
- Christian Science: An Examination of the Religion of Health [with Rosa M. Barrett] (1926) New York: Henry Holt & Co.
- Deathbed Visions. (1926) London: Methuen & Co.
