= Axel Hellstrom =

Axel Hellstrom (December 22, 1893 – July 22, 1933) was a German muscle reader, mentalist and stage magician. He redefined the art of muscle reading to such an extent that this technique, also known as "contact mind reading" and "Cumberlandism" (after a 19th-century practitioner named Stuart Cumberland), is now best known by the name "Hellstromism".

== Biography ==
Hellstrom was born Axel Vogt. He lived in Germany and fought in World War I where he watched a man perform an act of muscle reading. At the time, Germany did not allow mind reading unless it had a plausible explanation. The only type of mind reading allowed was muscle reading, and so Axel took advantage of it. He studied it carefully and taught himself everything. He entertained his fellow soldiers and became quite good at this old technique. After the war, he and his wife moved to America where he knew his art form would be accepted by many - especially magic audiences. Soon he was performing for professional magic audiences and amazed many people. After a short while, mind readers, and even fellow Hellstromists were questioning his ability.

During his live performances, his manager spoke for him because his English vocabulary was limited. Hellstrom would successfully complete many different challenges such as locating hidden items, performing actions that others were thinking of and determining which object someone had selected out of many options. The accuracy of his results was astonishing and he was soon known throughout the United States. He was well-respected by his peers in the stage magic community, and other performers paid hundreds of dollars to learn the secrets behind his technique.

During the 1930s, the American magician and mentalist Robert A. Nelson published the definitive book on Hellstrom's techniques, with his cooperation. This book, "Hellstromism," has remained an important reference on the subject of muscle reading well into the 21st century.

Modern practitioners of Hellstromism include the magicians Banachek, Kreskin, and Nader Hanna.
