= Social purity movement =

1800s temperance movement against prostitution

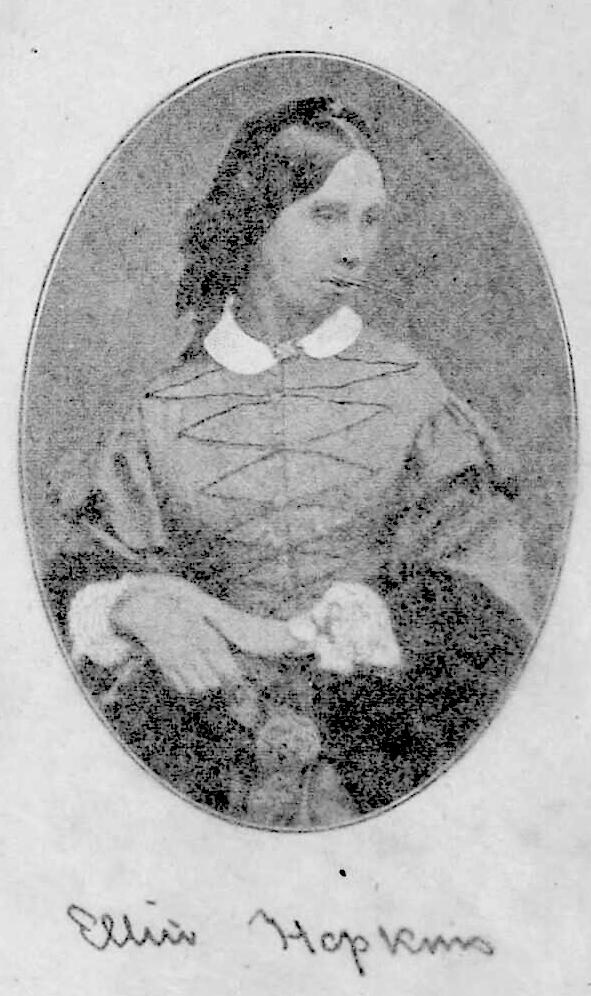
Ellice Hopkins

The social purity movement was a late 19th-century social movement that sought to abolish prostitution and other sexual activities that were considered immoral according to Christian morality. The movement was active in English-speaking nations from the late 1860s to about 1910, exerting an important influence on the contemporaneous feminist, eugenics, and birth control movements.

The roots of the social purity movement lay in early 19th-century moral reform movements, such as radical utopianism, abolitionism, and the temperance movement. In the late 19th century, "social" was a euphemism for "sexual"; the movement first formed in opposition to the legalization and regulation of prostitution, and quickly spread to other sex-related issues such as raising the age of consent, sexually segregating prisons, opposing contraception, preventing white slavery, and censoring pornography. Activists in the movement used a white cross for their symbol.

== Influences ==
The rapid changing in American society was evident in temperance, women's rights, evangelical revivalists, and workers rights movements. Born out of a few debatable movements was the “Social Purity Movement” that has left a lasting legacy on sexual ethics and female bodily autonomy in the United States. Although this movement was mainly focused on the specific task of eliminating prostitution, its advocates had varying agendas and the results of this movement were skewed from the original task. Evangelism and a general moral panic around venereal diseases fueled the movement into gaining widespread support across the American public, including the support of some feminists and conservatives alike. Leading up to the social purity movement, the prevalence of prostitution was growing and conversations were being had around legalizing prostitution and regulating its commerce. With the focus being on white women, even more specifically newly immigrated Eastern European white women, it was crucial that the popularity of prostitution be diminished to preserve the purity of white women (hence social purity). Prostitution was never legalized, yet the social purity movement had already begun and was breaking ground in other avenues to dampen prostitution and other products of lust.

Social purity as a movement took roots in the mid 1800s in England and was prominently led by an evangelical woman Jane Ellice Hopkins. She spent her early childhood and early adulthood on the east coast of America and her transformative social work began in the United Kingdom. She was responsible for a multitude of organised support groups for the movement and became successful in her appeal to male involvement in ways that other social puritists were not. Her deep dedication to the church not only gave her helpful connections in the spreading of this movement in Europe, but also gave her a characteristic drive and passion for this work. She was able to make changes in very practical ways, such as raising the legal age of consent for women to 16, and in individual moral ways, such as asking "good" Christian men to pledge themselves to respecting women and dismantling hypocrisy in sexual standards. Her work set a precedence for what was to be done in the United States. There was a gray area in this movement where feminists, eugenicists, and social purists could agree. Feminists were concerned about the sexual exploitation of women as an act of violence against them and eugenicists were concerned with the preservation of the ‘fittest’ citizens, needing white female chastity to achieve these aspirations. There was some intersection of goals with the social purists in this sense, and they inevitably influenced one another. Religion, feminism, and eugenicists found common ground in the control and/or protection of women's bodies as something sacred and necessary, but only white women's bodies were included in this protection.

== Mann Act ==
The Social Purity Movement came to fruition under the United States federal Mann Act passed in 1910, otherwise known as the White Slavery Traffic Act, named after politician James Mann. This Act originally intended to restrict the transportation of women by men across state lines for the purpose of ‘prostitution or debauchery’ but was later amended to include 'any other immoral purpose', which was interpreted in wildly different ways. The Mann Act was made possible through the use of regulating foreign commerce which could have its own philosophical discussion regarding the agency of women in the early 1900s. Under the revised Act under Section 3, it was stated that any man transporting a woman across state borders "with the intent and purpose of such person that such woman or girl shall engage in the practice of prostitution or debauchery, or any other immoral practice, whether with or without her consent...shall be deemed guilty of a felony."

The calling to action of the public came in the form of newspaper articles featuring "white slave narratives" that revealed the tragic, and "common", situation that women who left home found themselves in. Historians have referred to this as a part of a 'moral panic' that was sweeping across the United States during the Progressive Era, as activists and organizations were popping up in all different sections of American life demanding the government intervention on spreading corruption. These white slave narratives re-enforced assumptions that male sexuality was virtually uncontrollable, to the point of coercing and kidnapping women into prostitution. The level to which some women were choosing prostitution versus those who were forced into it is unclear, but the numbers that were estimated are overestimated enough to lead scholars to believe much of this panic was ill-informed.

== See also ==
- Sexual Politics
- Social hygiene movement
- Birth control movement in the United States
- Comstock law
- Social purity movement in Switzerland

== Notes ==
Citations

Bibliography

- Gordon, L. (2002). The Moral Property of Women: A History of Birth Control Politics in America. University of Illinois Press.
- Olasky, Marvin N. (1992). Abortion Rites: A Social History of Abortion in America. Good News Publishers. ISBN 978-0-89107-687-2.
