= George Miller Beard =

American neurologist (1839–1883)

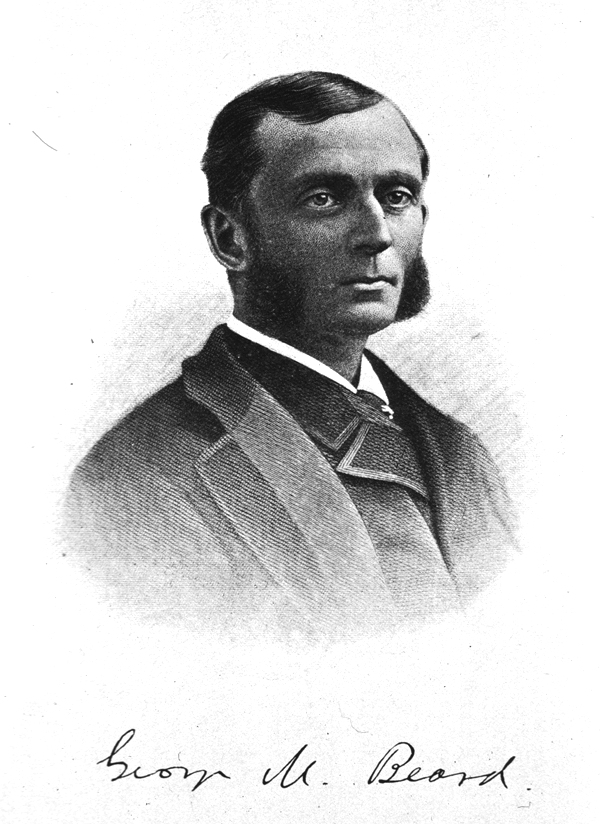
- Born: May 8, 1839; Montville, Connecticut
- Died: January 23, 1883 (aged 43); New York City
- Education: College of Physicians and Surgeons of New York (MD, 1866)
- Occupation: neurologist

George Miller Beard (May 8, 1839 – January 23, 1883) was an American neurologist who popularized the term neurasthenia, starting around 1869.

Beard is remembered best for having defined neurasthenia as a medical condition with symptoms of fatigue, anxiety, headache, impotence, neuralgia and depression, as a result of exhaustion of the central nervous system's energy reserves, which Beard attributed to civilization. Physicians who agreed with Beard associated neurasthenia with the stresses of urbanization and the increasingly competitive business environment. Stated simply, people were attempting to achieve more than their constitution could cope with. Typically this followed a short illness from which the patient was thought to have recovered. In his 1884 book on Sexual Neurasthenia, he linked this disease to what he called "sexual perversion," but included masturbation, non-heterosexuality, and sexual dysfunction.

Beard was a champion of many reforms of psychiatry, and was a founder of the National Association for the Protection of the Insane and the Prevention of Insanity. He also took an unpopular stance against the death penalty for persons with mental illness, going so far as to campaign for leniency for Charles J. Guiteau, the assassin of President James Garfield on the basis that the man was not guilty because of insanity.

== Biography ==
Beard was born in Montville, Connecticut, on May 8, 1839, to Reverend Spencer F. Beard, a Congregational minister, and Lucy A. Leonard. Beard's mother died in 1842, and his father remarried the following year: to Mary Ann Fellowes. After attending Phillips-Andover Academy, Beard graduated from Yale College in 1862, and received his medical degree from the College of Physicians and Surgeons of New York in 1866.

While still in medical school during the American Civil War, he served as an assistant surgeon in the West Gulf squadron of the Union Navy aboard the gunboat New London. After the war, and upon his graduation from medical school, he married Elizabeth Ann Alden of Westville, Connecticut on December 25, 1866. Beard died in New York City on January 23, 1883.

== Startle reflex ==
One of the more unusual disorders he studied from 1878 onwards was the exaggerated startle reflex among French-Canadian lumbermen from the Moosehead Lake region of Maine, that came to be known as the Jumping Frenchmen of Maine. If they were startled by a short verbal command, they would carry out the instruction without hesitation, irrespective of the consequences. The studies stimulated further research by the military and Georges Gilles de la Tourette.

Value of Deductive Reasoning

Lest I may be accused of inconsistency, I may say that
whatever I have done during the past few years in the way of
detecting and exposing mediums, clairvoyants and mind-readers
has been, not for the purpose of ascertaining the truth or falsity
of the claims made by these performers and their advocates,
since that question is … settled definitely, and forever by deduct-
ive reasoning, but partly in order to solve some questions relating
to the psychology of jugglery – a most instructive and much
neglected – and partly, also, out of regard to the weaker brethren
who are unable to employ deductive reasoning, and can only be
taught through what, in some way, appeals to the senses.
These exposures are, in strict logic, no absolute disproval [sic]
in the abstract of the claims made by those who are exposed; but
their influence with the people, even with physicians and scientific
men, is, as I have found by experience, enormously greater than
any scientific method of treating the subject possibly can be. …
George Miller Beard (1877)

== Electro-therapeutics ==
Beard was also involved extensively with electricity as a medical treatment, and published extensively on the subject.

== Etheric force ==
Beard became involved with Thomas Edison's claim to be able to project electrical influence without current through etheric force. As explained in a biography of Edison:

Although in later years Edison even transferred credit to Beard for inventing the term "etheric force", in fact the good doctor suggested the Greek apolia as a more accurate description, "given", he observed, "that the want of polarity is the leading fact of it...¶ This assertion became the informing theme of Beard’s major twenty-eight page, illustrated essay, "Experiments with the Alleged New Force", in the November number of the Archives of Electrology and Neurology. The article was subsequently published in the form of an extended letter to the editor of the New York Daily Tribune, December 9, 1875, as "Mr. Edison’s 'New Force': Result of Physiological and Other Experiments – Characteristics of the Alleged Force – The Apparatus Used", and later in its most definitive form in the January 22 Scientific American, "The Nature of the Newly Discovered Force".

He described the force as "somewhere between light and heat on the one hand and magnetism and electricity on the other, with some features of all these forces."

== Skepticism ==
Beard was a critic of claims of the paranormal and spiritualism which he wrote was one of history's greatest delusions. He published articles on anomalistic psychology such as The Psychology of Spiritism (1879) exposing the fraud of mediumship and describing its psychological basis.

The term "muscle reading" was coined in the 1870s by Beard to describe the methods of the mentalist J. Randall Brown.

== Publications ==
- The Medical Use of Electricity (1867)
- Our Home Physician (1869)
- Stimulants and Narcotics: Medically, Philosophically, and Morally Considered (1871)
- Cases of Hysteria, Neurasthenia, Spinal Irritation, or Allied Affections (1874)
- Medical and Surgical Cases Treated by Electricity (1874)
- Archives of Electrology and Neurology, volumes 1 & 2 (1874,5) via HathiTrust
- "A New Theory of Trance and its Bearings on Human Testimony", Journal of Nervous and Mental Disease, Volume 4, Number 1, (January 1877), pages 1-47.
- "Physiology of Mind-Reading", The Popular Science Monthly, Volume 10, (February 1877), pp. 459–473.
- "Mind-Reading by the Ear", The Popular Science Monthly, Volume 11, (July 1877), pp. 362–363.
- A Practical Treatise on Nervous Exhaustion (Neurasthenia): Its Symptoms, Nature, Sequences, Treatment (1880)
- A Practical Treatise on Sea-Sickness (1881)
- American Nervousness, Its Causes and Consequences (1881)
- The Psychology of the Salem Witchcraft Excitement of 1692 (1882)
- Study of Trance, Muscle-Reading and Allied Nervous Phenomena in Europe and America, With a Letter on the Moral Character of Trance Subjects, and a Defence of Dr. Charcot (1882)
- "Sexual neurasthenia (nervous exhaustion) : its hygiene, causes, symptoms and treatment with a chapter on diet for the nervous" (1884)
- The Salem Witchcraft: The Planchette Mystery: and Modern Spiritualism (1886)
