= Franz Polgar =

Psychologist, hypnotist, entertainer (1900–1979)

Franz Julius Polgar
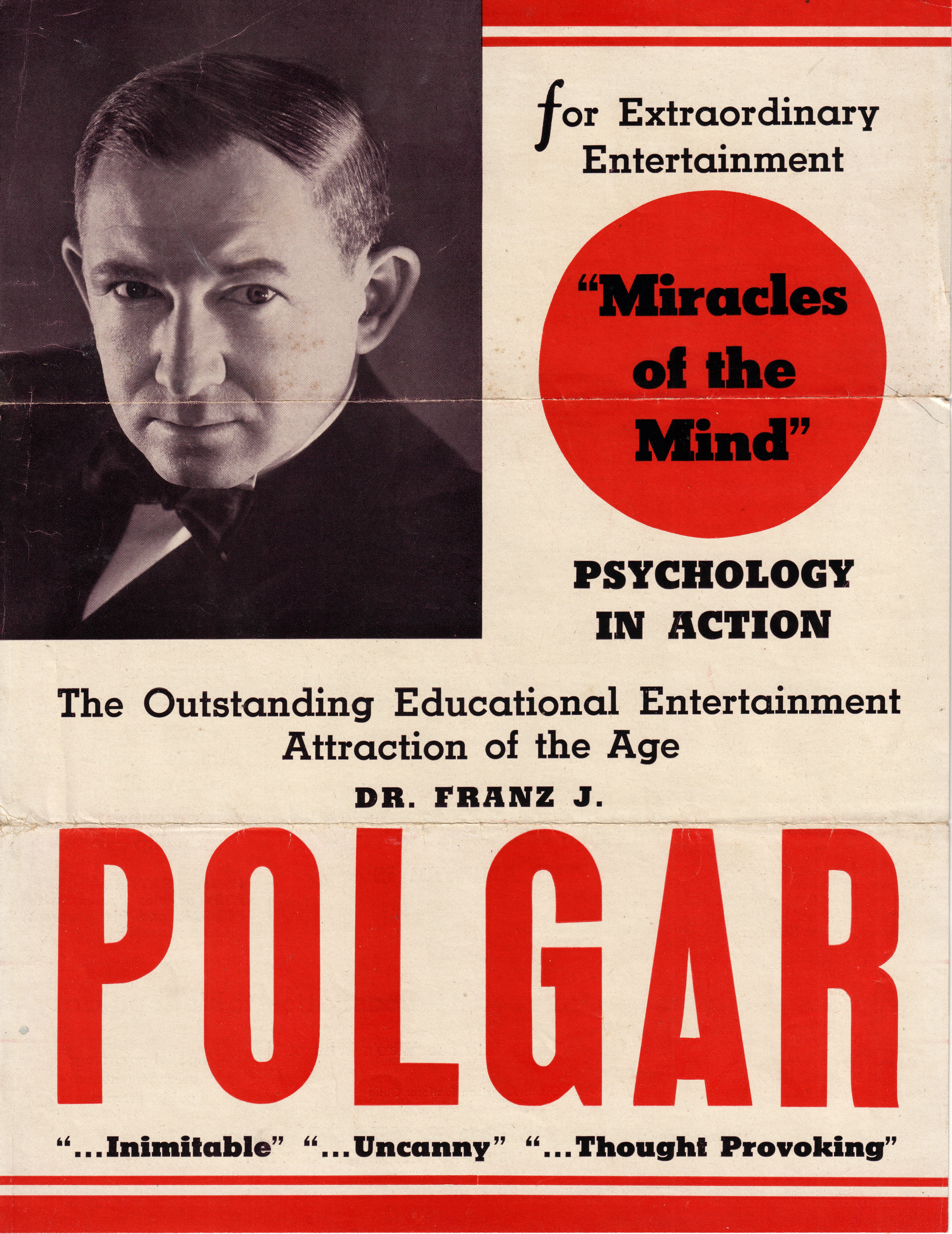
- Advertising poster for "Miracles of the Mind"
- Born: Franz Polgar; 18 April 1900; Enying, Fejér, Hungary
- Died: 19 June 1979 (aged 79); Mamaroneck, New York
- Education: Ph.D. (Budapest)
- Occupations: Hypnotist, lecturer
- Spouse: Lillian Sheiman (1911-)
- Children: Julian (b.1945), Risa Willa (b.1947)

Franz Julius Polgar (April 18, 1900 – June 19, 1979) was a psychologist, hypnotist, lecturer and entertainer.

== Family ==
The son of Julius Polgar, and Risa Kohn (1869-), née Kohn, Franz Polgar was born in city of Enying, in Fejér County, Hungary on April 18, 1900. He arrived in the United States in 1931, and was naturalized on 7 September 1944.

He married Lillian Sheiman (1911-), in New York, on 24 September 24, 1938. They had two children, Julian (b.1945) and Risa Willa (b.1947).

== Education ==
He earned a Ph.D. in Psychology from the University of Budapest.

== Hypnotist ==
In his 1951 autobiography Polgar claimed that he had served as Sigmund Freud's "medical hypnotist" (Polgar's term) in 1924 and had worked in close association with Freud for six months and had assisted in the treatment of Freud's patients. In 1982, Gravitz and Gerton investigated this claim and determined that it had no foundation.

He honed his hypnotism skills by working in speakeasy bars in New York City. His wife, Lillian, became his booking and publications manager.

During the early days of television, and soon after an early 1949 appearance at the Newburgh Free Academy in Newburgh, New York, in which he claimed to have induced a student, Donald A. Romano, into a trance, Dr. Polgar had a short lived 10-minute show on the CBS television network called The Amazing Polgar.

Most of his entertaining was done in colleges, universities, and resorts. His show consisted of three parts: hypnosis demonstration, a mentalism or "mind reading" stunt where he would use Hellstromism to find an object hidden by his audience, and various memory stunts.
