= Florence Barrett =

British surgeon (1867–1945)

Lady Florence Barrett CH CBE FRSM
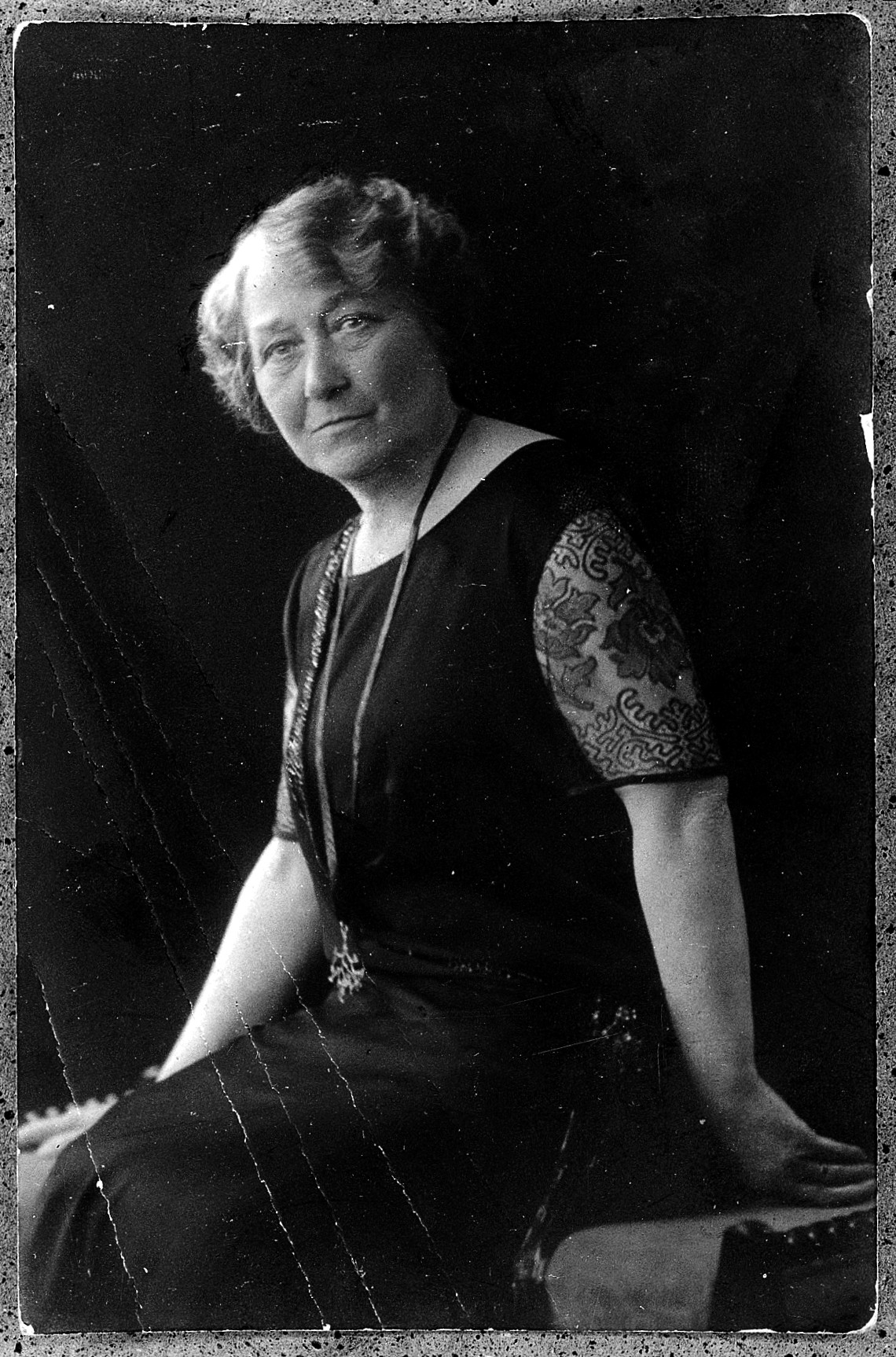
- Born: Florence Elizabeth Perry; 18 February 1867; Henbury, Gloucestershire, England
- Died: 7 August 1945 (aged 78); Maidenhead, Berkshire, England
- Education: University College, Bristol; London School of Medicine for Women (Royal Free Hospital)
- Spouse(s): Frederick George Ingor Willey (m. 1896); William Fletcher Barrett (m. 1916)
- Medical career
- Profession: Surgeon
- Field: Physician
- Institutions: London School of Medicine for Women (Royal Free Hospital)
- Sub-specialties: Gynaecology, Obstetrics

Florence Elizabeth, Lady Barrett, CH, CBE, FRSM (née Perry; 18 February 1867 – 7 August 1945) was a consultant surgeon at the Mothers' Hospital in Clapton and the Royal Free Hospital in London. She served as president of the Medical Women's Federation, as joint vice-president of the Obstetrics and Gynaecology Section of the British Medical Association and president of the Medical Women’s International Association, as well as being a council member of the Eugenics Society. She was a gynaecologist, obstetrician and eugenicist.

== Early and private life ==
Lady Barrett was born on 18 February 1867 to a wealthy family in Henbury in Gloucestershire now part of Bristol. She was the fourth child of merchant and railway agent Benjamin Perry and his wife Elizabeth Perry (née Willey).

Her early education was at home with governesses and as a teenager Barrett decided to become a doctor. She achieved a first class degree in Physiology and Chemistry in 1895 at the Bristol Medical School. She then trained at the London School of Medicine for Women in 1900 where she obtained a Bachelor of Medicine (MB) in 1900 and then a Doctor of Medicine (MD) in 1906. At the time the London School of Medicine for Women was the only hospital in England where women could train in medical practice.

Barrett married her maternal cousin Frederick George Ingor Willey, who was a surgeon and the son of Josiah Willey FRCS, in 1896. They had no children. In 1909, Barrett brought divorce proceedings against her husband. Her petition was heard in May and she was granted a final decree in November.

In 1916, Barrett married Sir William Fletcher Barrett FRS. At the time of their marriage, Sir William, aged 72, was a former Professor of Physics at the Royal College of Science for Ireland in Dublin. His research focused on psychic phenomena, and he later founded the Society for Psychical Research in 1882. She claimed to have conversed with her husband after his death in 1925 through the help of a third-party. She published an account of the sittings, entitled Personality Survives Death, in 1937.

== Medical career ==
Barrett qualified as a doctor in 1906. She joined the staff of the Royal Free Hospital in 1906, which was the only hospital in England where women could train in medical practice at the time. Before World War I, she developed voluntary centres for the feeding of expectant mothers and children. She was an obstetric surgeon at the Mothers' Hospital from 1913, and an obstetric and gynaecological surgeon at the Royal Free Hospital. Barrett worked there as a surgeon at a time when operations were at their peak.

In 1916, Barrett led a fund-raising campaign to extend the hospital, adding maternity, paediatric and infant welfare facilities. She helped to develop the London School of Medicine for Women at the Royal Free Hospital, of which she became Dean and then President in 1937.

Barrett was an active member of the Eugenics Society, and served on its council from 1917. Barrett advocated for "state interference" in the sex lives of "the unfit" to implement birth control, because she believed that propaganda would be ineffective. Barrett felt that contraception should be overseen by the medical profession and expressed preference for abstinence over contraception in "normal healthy individuals". She preferred to recommend the use of the rhythm method and condoms over other methods.

In 1921, Barrett and other members of the Medical Women's Federation protested the decisions of Glasgow and St Pancras councils to refuse to employ medical women who were married and whose husbands had jobs, arguing that this contravened the Sex Disqualification (Removal) Act 1919. Also in 1921, Barrett gave a report to the annual meeting of the Medical Women’s International Association in Geneva, Switzerland.

Barrett served as president of the Medical Women's Federation in 1923, additionally chairing the Federation's menopause research committee. She served as joint vice-president of the Obstetrics and Gynaecology Section of the British Medical Association. In 1924, Barrett was a founder member of the Cancer Research Committee (CRC), established to investigate radium treatment of cervical cancer. She was also a Fellow of the Royal Society of Medicine and president of the Medical Women's International Association (1924–1929).

== Later life ==
Barrett was appointed as a CBE in the first list of awards for the Order of the British Empire in 1917, and became a Member of the Order of the Companions of Honour in 1929.

Barrett died in Maidenhead, Berkshire. Her funeral took place at St. John the Baptist Church in Cookham Dean, Berkshire and a memorial service was held at St Martin-in-the-Fields, London. Her obituary in The Times stated "She was unquestionably one of the most distinguished of medical women". She left her husband’s library to the Society for Psychical Research, and also left £1,000 to endow a scholarship at the London School of Medicine for Women.
