= Sensitive flame =

A sensitive flame is a gas flame which under suitable adjustment of pressure resonates readily with sounds or air vibrations in the vicinity. Noticed by both the American scientist John LeConte and the English physicist William Fletcher Barrett, they recorded the effect that a shrill note had upon a gas flame issuing from a tapering jet. The phenomenon caught the attention of the Irish physicist John Tyndall who gave a lecture on the process to the Royal Institution in January 1867.

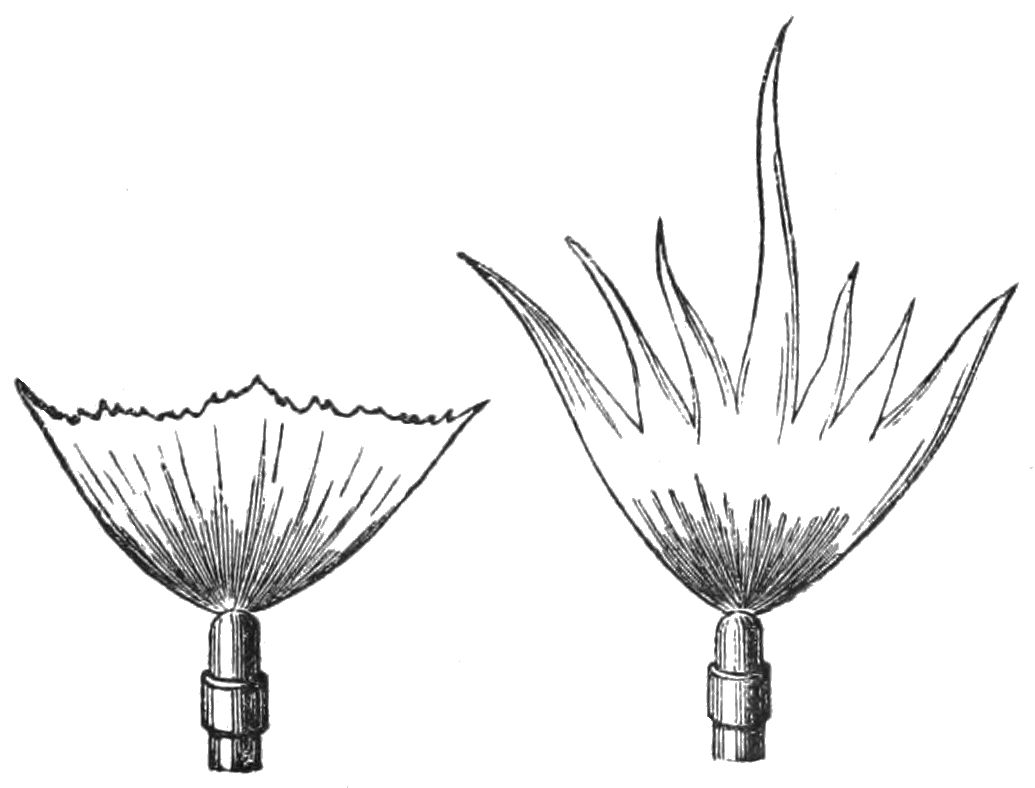
Fig. 3

While not necessary to observe the effect, a higher flame temperature allows for easier observation. Sounds at lower to mid-range frequencies have little to no effect on the flame. However, shrill noises at high frequencies produce noticeable effects on the flame. Even the ticking of a pocket watch was observed as producing a high enough frequency to affect the flame.

== See also ==
- Pyrophone
