= Ellice Hopkins =

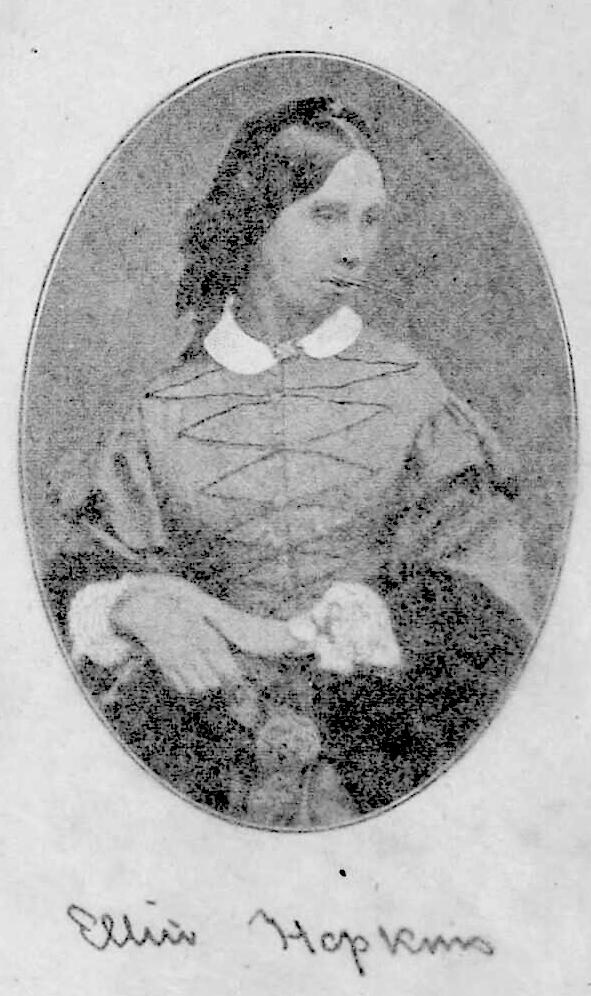
- Ellice Hopkins, from the 1907 posthumous biography by Rosa Mary Barrett.
- Born: Jane Ellice Hopkins; 30 October 1836; Cambridge, England
- Died: 21 August 1904 (aged 67); Brighton, England

Ellice Hopkins (30 October 1836 – 21 August 1904) was a Victorian social campaigner and author. Hopkins co-founded the White Cross Army in 1883, and vigorously advocated moral purity while criticising contemporary sexual double standards.

== Early life ==
Jane Ellice Hopkins was born in Cambridge, the daughter of William Hopkins, a mathematics tutor at the University of Cambridge, and his second wife, Caroline Frances Boys Hopkins. As a girl, Hopkins knew the photographer Julia Margaret Cameron. At age 30, after her father's death, Hopkins moved to Brighton with her mother.

== Activism ==
In 1874 Hopkins and rescue worker Sarah Robinson established the Soldier's Institute at Portsmouth, and in 1876 toured several British towns, recruiting thousands of women to the Ladies' Association for the Care of Friendless Girls. Her biographer describes her as "instrumental" in the passing of the Industrial Schools Amendment Act 1880, which allowed children to be removed from hazardous homes (including brothels) and placed in industrial schools. She also lobbied for the Criminal Law Amendment Act 1885, which raised the female age of consent from 13 to 16, and criminalised male homosexuality. Hopkins co-founded the White Cross Army, a men's Christian organization, in 1883 with Bishop J. B. Lightfoot of Durham. "It was hard that the power which would have been a glory to me if I were a man, should be held a shame and a disgrace to me because I was a woman," she recalled of her work.

== Writing ==
Hopkins wrote in a wide variety of genres, including two volumes of poetry, English Idylls (1865) and Autumn Swallows (1883), and a sensational gothic novel, Rose Turquand (1874). An Englishwoman's Work Among Workingmen (1875) was a memoir of her activism. She wrote pamphlets, most notably True Manliness (1883), and Christian devotional works, including Christ the Consoler, A Book of Comfort for the Sick (1879), and A plea for the wider action of the Church of England in the prevention of the degradation of women, an essay in which she criticised the contemporary double standard by which women were disproportionately blamed for sexual immorality. Her last books were The Power of Womanhood (1899), on the role of mothers in "moral evolution", and The Story of Life (1902), a guide intended to help parents teach sex education to their adolescent children.

== Personal life ==
Multiple chronic health issues led Hopkins to withdraw from public life in 1888. She died in 1904, aged 67 years, in Brighton. Fellow activist Rosa Mary Barrett wrote a short biography of Hopkins, published in 1907.
