= Etheric force =

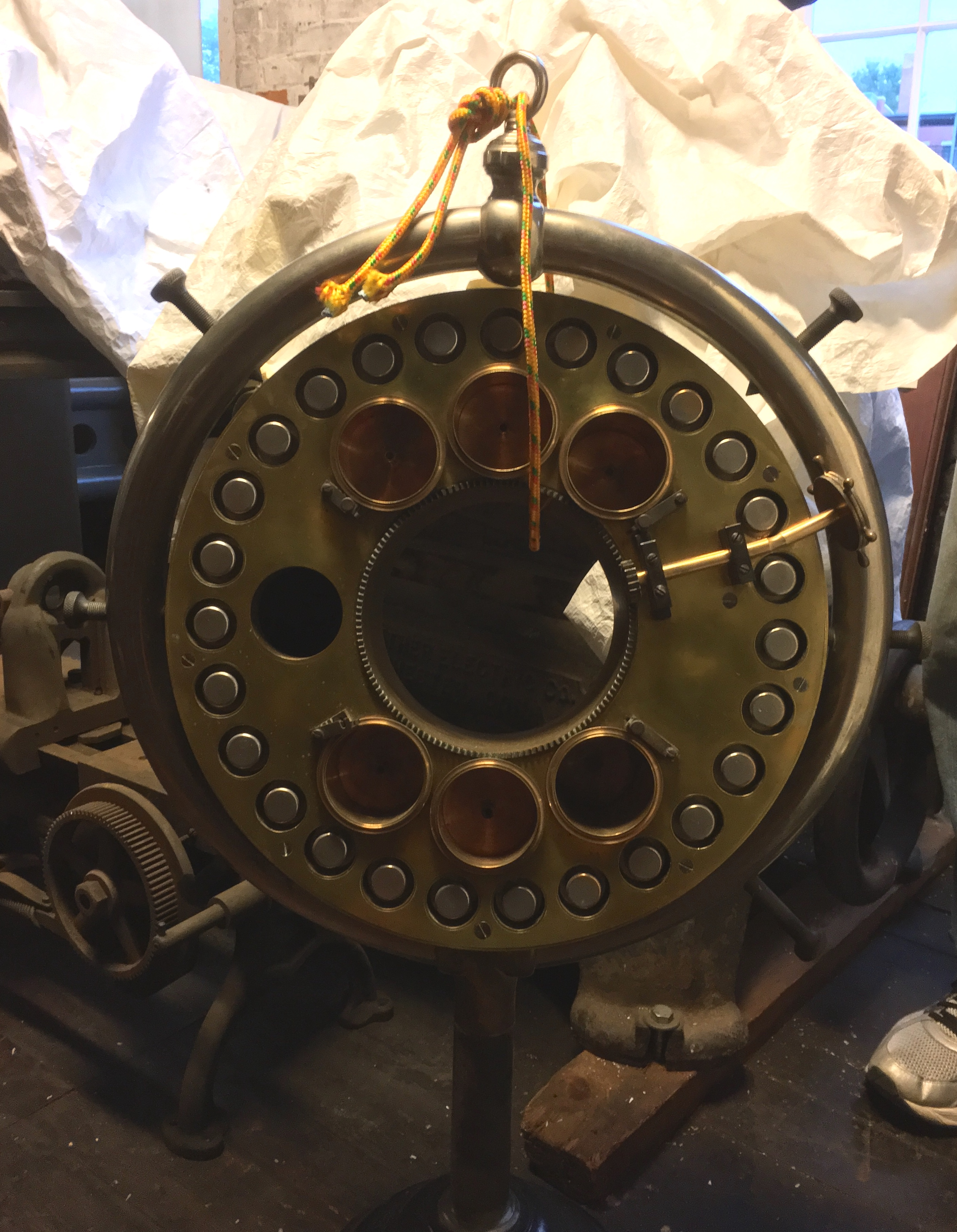
An etheric force machine, also known as the Keely Disintegrator. In storage at the American Precision Museum

Etheric force is a term Thomas Edison coined to describe a phenomenon later understood as high frequency electromagnetic waves—effectively, radio. Edison believed it was the mysterious force that some believed pervaded the ether.

At the end of 1875, Edison and his assistants were experimenting with the Acoustic Telegraph when they noticed that a rapidly vibrating spark gap produced a spark in an adjacent relay. Subsequent investigation showed that the phenomenon could be made to occur at a distance of several feet without interconnecting cables. Edison, with this small amount of evidence, announced that it was "a true unknown force", since he believed that the spark transmitted electricity without carrying any charge. Edison concluded that this discovery had the potential to cheapen telegraphic communication and to allow transatlantic cables to be laid without insulation. He was also interested in finding new forces as a means for providing scientific explanations for spiritualist, occult and other allegedly supernatural phenomena following his disenchantment with Helena Blavatsky's Theosophy.

Edison's apparatus consisted of a spark gap vibrating at a high frequency powered by batteries and connected to tin foil sheet about 12 by 8 inches, effectively acting as an antenna. A similar tin foil sheet, connected to ground was located at about eight feet away with two more similar, un-grounded tin foil sheets between. Sparks could be seen at the "receiver" sheets. Effectively, Edison had observed wireless transmission and was later to regret that he had not pursued it.

Edison's last laboratory notebook entry on etheric force in 1875, which shows his experimental apparatus, can be seen at the Edison Papers at Rutgers School of Arts and Sciences.

== Controversy ==
Thomas Edison announced the discovery, which he called etheric force, to the press and reports began to appear in Newark newspapers from November 29, 1875. While etheric force initially met with an enthusiastic reception, sceptics began to question whether it truly was a new phenomenon or merely a consequence of some already known phenomenon such as electromagnetic induction. Leaders among the doubters were James Ashley, editor of the Telegrapher, the inventor Elihu Thomson and Edwin Houston, a high school teacher with whom Thomson had studied. Thomson and Houston conducted a series of careful experiments where they discovered that the sparks actually carried a charge, and they announced their results, not in the popular press as Edison had done, but in a scientific journal, the Journal of the Franklin Institute. This prompted a reply from Edison, more experiments and more scientific papers.

Nevertheless, Edison found support from a fellow diner at Delmonico's: George Miller Beard had experimented with electrophysiology, and enthusiastically promoted Edison's new force, most significantly in the pages of Scientific American.

Scepticism is not easily explained on scientific grounds as James Clerk Maxwell had predicted such waves in 1864 (confirmed by Heinrich Hertz in 1889). The negative reception is perhaps better understood as a result of Edison's uneasy relationship with the professional scientific community.

Eventually the controversy increased to the point where Edison was pressured by his principal financial backers, Western Union, to desist from etheric force research and publicity over it, and to devote himself to what Western Union saw as more commercially viable projects. Edison abandoned work despite having been able to send signals twenty to thirty feet. He also drafted, but did not file, a patent application for an "etheric telegraph" before he abandoned etheric force.

== Later development ==
In 1885 Edison again took up investigation of transmission by spark while working on a railway telegraph system and was able to get transmission of five hundred feet. Edison thought it might be suitable for ship-to-ship and ship-to-shore communication, taking out a patent for the system. Edison did not develop the patent commercially but according to his former assistant Francis Jehl, sold it to Guglielmo Marconi who developed it into radio.
