= White Cross Army =

Organisation within the Social Purity movement

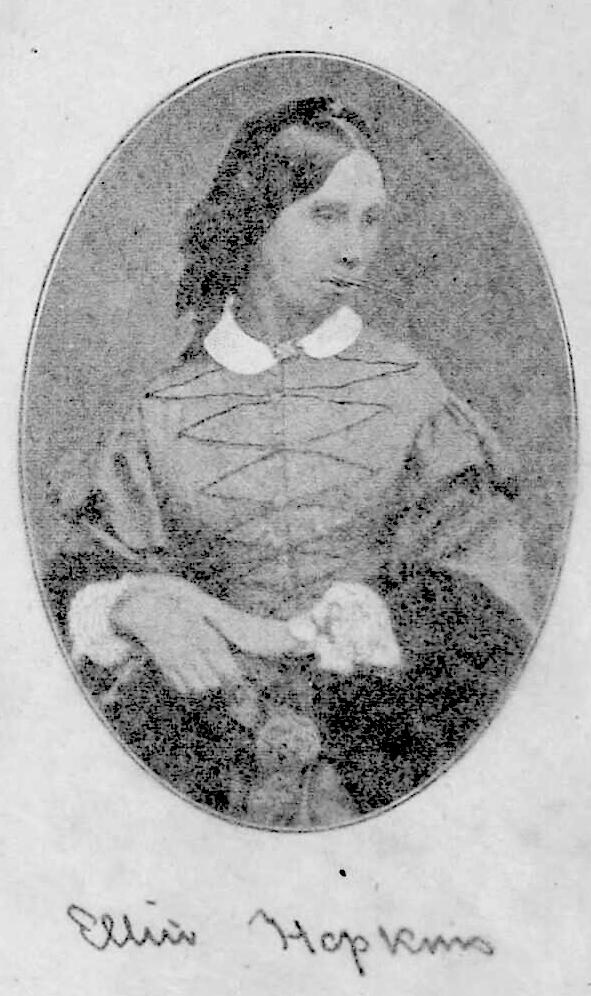
The White Cross Army was founded by Ellice Hopkins

The White Cross Army was an organisation set up in 1883 by philanthropist Ellice Hopkins with help from the Bishop of Durham, to promote "social purity". The recruits – all of them men – pledged to show a "chivalrous respect for womanhood", to apply ideas of purity equally to men and women, and not to indulge in foul language or indecent behaviour. It was renamed the White Cross League in 1891, and merged with the Church of England Purity Society, which had been formed by Edward White Benson.

== Concept and structure ==
The organisation was Christian in ethos but, at the insistence of Hopkins and somewhat unusually for a purity association, it was non-denominational in practice. Its name was symbolic: White denoted purity, Cross referred to the campaign being for Christ, and Army reflected its disciplined nature. It adopted as its motto the words of Sir Galahad:

My strength is as the strength of ten,
Because my heart is pure

The army based its structure on that of the temperance movement. Its target audience was mostly working-class men, who were exhorted to pledge their support for its aims by speakers at mass meetings. In lectures delivered by the organisation, the pledge of purity was defined for married men as the practice of sexual restraint, while young and unmarried men were expected to practice chastity and renounce masturbation. As with the Church of England Purity Society, whose goals were similar but aimed at upper-class men, the Army believed that it was men who should be responsible for sexual virtue.

== Regional distribution ==
There were 102 affiliated branches in Britain within a year of formation, and branches in Australia, Canada, Germany, India and the United States. The British branches had attracted 2,000 pledge-takers in that time and were mostly in the industrialised regions of The Midlands and North England.

== See also ==
- Ellice Hopkins
- Social purity movement
