= Telepathy =

Psychic ability

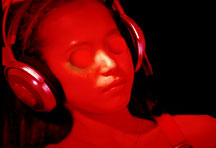
The Ganzfeld experiments that aimed to demonstrate telepathy have been criticized for lack of replication and poor controls.

Telepathy (from Ancient Greek τῆλε (têle) 'distant' and πάθος/-πάθεια (páthos/-pátheia) 'feeling, perception, passion, affliction, experience') is the purported vicarious transmission of information from one person's mind to another's without using any known human sensory channels or physical interaction. The term was coined in 1882 by the classical scholar Frederic W. H. Myers, a founder of the Society for Psychical Research (SPR), and has remained more popular than the earlier expression thought-transference.

Telepathy experiments have historically been criticized for a lack of proper controls and repeatability. There is no good evidence that telepathy exists, and the topic is generally considered by the scientific community to be pseudoscience. Telepathy is a common theme in science fiction.

== Origins of the concept ==
According to historians such as Roger Luckhurst and Janet Oppenheim the origin of the concept of telepathy in Western civilization can be traced to the late 19th century and the formation of the Society for Psychical Research. As the physical sciences made significant advances, scientific concepts were applied to mental phenomena (e.g., animal magnetism), with the hope that this would help to understand paranormal phenomena. The modern concept of telepathy emerged in this context.

Psychical researcher Eric Dingwall criticized SPR founding members Frederic W. H. Myers and William F. Barrett for trying to "prove" telepathy rather than objectively analyze whether or not it existed.

== Thought reading ==
In the late 19th century, the magician and mentalist Washington Irving Bishop would perform "thought reading" demonstrations. Bishop claimed no supernatural powers and ascribed his powers to muscular sensitivity (reading thoughts from unconscious bodily cues). Bishop was investigated by a group of scientists including the editor of the British Medical Journal and the psychologist Francis Galton. Bishop performed several feats successfully, such as correctly identifying a selected spot on a table and locating a hidden object. During the experiment, Bishop required physical contact with a subject who knew the correct answer. He would hold the hand or wrist of the helper. The scientists concluded that Bishop was not a genuine telepath but was instead using a highly trained skill to detect ideomotor movements.

Another famous thought reader was the magician Stuart Cumberland. He was famous for performing blindfolded feats such as identifying a hidden object in a room that a person had picked out or asking someone to imagine a murder scene and then attempt to read the subject's thoughts and identify the victim and reenact the crime. Cumberland claimed to possess no genuine psychic ability and his thought-reading performances could only be demonstrated by holding the hand of his subject to read their muscular movements. He came into dispute with psychical researchers associated with the Society for Psychical Research who were searching for genuine cases of telepathy. Cumberland argued that both telepathy and communication with the dead were impossible and that the minds of people cannot be read through telepathy, but only by muscle reading.

== Case studies ==
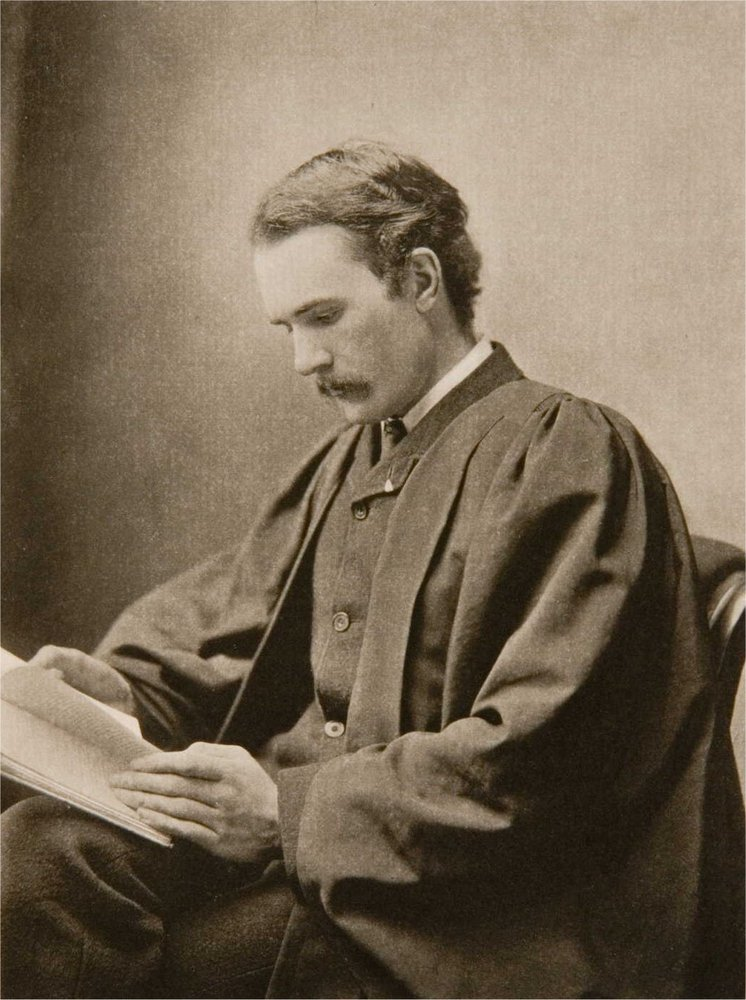
Gilbert Murray conducted early telepathy experiments.

In the late 19th century the Creery Sisters (Mary, Alice, Maud, Kathleen, and Emily) were tested by the Society for Psychical Research and believed to have genuine psychic ability. However, during a later experiment they were caught utilizing signal codes and they confessed to fraud. George Albert Smith and Douglas Blackburn were claimed to be genuine psychics by the Society for Psychical Research but Blackburn confessed to fraud:

For nearly thirty years the telepathic experiments conducted by Mr. G. A. Smith and myself have been accepted and cited as the basic evidence of the truth of thought transference... ...the whole of those alleged experiments were bogus, and originated in the honest desire of two youths to show how easily men of scientific mind and training could be deceived when seeking for evidence in support of a theory they were wishful to establish.

Between 1916 and 1924, Gilbert Murray conducted 236 experiments into telepathy and reported 36% as successful. However, it was suggested that the results could be explained by hyperaesthesia as he could hear what was being said by the sender. Psychologist Leonard T. Troland had carried out experiments in telepathy at Harvard University which were reported in 1917. The subjects produced below chance expectations.

Arthur Conan Doyle and W. T. Stead were duped into believing Julius and Agnes Zancig had genuine psychic powers. Both Doyle and Stead wrote that the Zancigs performed telepathy. In 1924, Julius and Agnes Zancig confessed that their mind reading act was a trick and published the secret code and all the details of the trick method they had used under the title of Our Secrets!! in a London newspaper.

In 1924, Robert H. Gault of Northwestern University with Gardner Murphy conducted the first American radio test for telepathy. The results were entirely negative. One of their experiments involved the attempted thought transmission of a chosen number between one and one-thousand. Out of 2,010 replies, none was correct. This is below the theoretical chance figure of two correct replies in such a situation.

In February 1927, with the co-operation of the British Broadcasting Corporation (BBC), V. J. Woolley, who was at the time the Research Officer for the SPR, arranged a telepathy experiment in which radio listeners were asked to take part. The experiment involved 'agents' thinking about five selected objects in an office at Tavistock Square, whilst listeners on the radio were asked to identify the objects from the BBC studio at Savoy Hill. 24,659 answers were received. The results revealed no evidence of telepathy.

A famous experiment in telepathy was recorded by the American author Upton Sinclair in his book Mental Radio which documents Sinclair's test of psychic abilities of Mary Craig Sinclair, his second wife. She attempted to duplicate 290 pictures which were drawn by her husband. Sinclair claimed Mary successfully duplicated 65 of them, with 155 "partial successes" and 70 failures. However, these experiments were not conducted in a controlled scientific laboratory environment. Science writer Martin Gardner suggested that the possibility of sensory leakage during the experiment had not been ruled out:

In the first place, an intuitive wife, who knows her husband intimately, may be able to guess with a fair degree of accuracy what he is likely to draw—particularly if the picture is related to some freshly recalled event the two experienced in common. At first, simple pictures like chairs and tables would likely predominate, but as these are exhausted, the field of choice narrows and pictures are more likely to be suggested by recent experiences. It is also possible that Sinclair may have given conversational hints during some of the tests—hints which in his strong will to believe, he would promptly forget about. Also, one must not rule out the possibility that in many tests, made across the width of a room, Mrs. Sinclair may have seen the wiggling of the top of a pencil, or arm movements, which would convey to her unconscious a rough notion of the drawing.

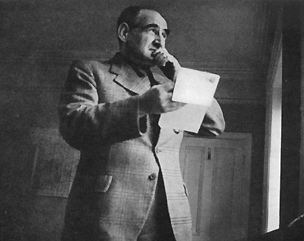
Frederick Marion who was investigated by the Society for Psychical Research in the late 1930–1940s.

The Turner-Ownbey long distance telepathy experiment was discovered to contain flaws. May Frances Turner positioned herself in the Duke Parapsychology Laboratory whilst Sara Ownbey claimed to receive transmissions 250 miles away. For the experiment Turner would think of a symbol and write it down whilst Ownbey would write her guesses. The scores were highly successful and both records were supposed to be sent to J. B. Rhine; however, Ownbey sent them to Turner. Critics pointed out this invalidated the results as she could have simply written her own record to agree with the other. When the experiment was repeated and the records were sent to Rhine the scores dropped to average.

Another example is the experiment carried out by the author Harold Sherman with the explorer Hubert Wilkins who carried out their own experiment in telepathy for five and a half months starting in October 1937. This took place when Sherman was in New York and Wilkins was in the Arctic. The experiment consisted of Sherman and Wilkins at the end of each day to relax and visualise a mental image or "thought impression" of the events or thoughts they had experienced in the day and then to record those images and thoughts on paper in a diary. The results at the end when comparing Sherman's and Wilkins' diaries were claimed to be more than 60 percent.

The full results of the experiments were published in 1942 in a book by Sherman and Wilkins titled Thoughts Through Space. In the book, both Sherman and Wilkins had written they believed they had demonstrated that it was possible to send and receive thought impressions from the mind of one person to another. The magician John Booth wrote that the experiment was not an example of telepathy as a high percentage of misses had occurred. Booth wrote it was more likely that the "hits" were the result of "coincidence, law of averages, subconscious expectancy, logical inference or a plain lucky guess". A review of their book in the American Journal of Orthopsychiatry cast doubt on their experiment, noting "the study was published five years after it was conducted, arouses suspicion on the validity of the conclusions.

In 1948, on the BBC radio Maurice Fogel made the claim that he could demonstrate telepathy. This intrigued the journalist Arthur Helliwell who wanted to discover his methods. He found that Fogel's mind reading acts were all based on trickery as he relied on information about members of his audience before the show started. Helliwell exposed Fogel's methods in a newspaper article. Although Fogel managed to fool some people into believing he could perform genuine telepathy, the majority of his audience knew he was a showman.

In a series of experiments Samuel Soal and his assistant K. M. Goldney examined 160 subjects over 128,000 trials and obtained no evidence for the existence of telepathy. Soal tested Basil Shackleton and Gloria Stewart between 1941 and 1943 in over five hundred sittings and over twenty thousand guesses. Shackleton scored 2890 compared with a chance expectation of 2308 and Gloria scored 9410 compared with a chance level of 7420. It was later discovered the results had been tampered with. Gretl Albert who was present during many of the experiments said she had witnessed Soal altering the records during the sessions. Betty Marwick discovered Soal had not used the method of random selection of numbers as he had claimed. Marwick showed that there had been manipulation of the score sheets and all experiments reported by Soal had thereby become discredited.

In 1979 the physicists John G. Taylor and Eduardo Balanovski wrote the only scientifically feasible explanation for telepathy could be electromagnetism (EM) involving EM fields. In a series of experiments the EM levels were many orders of magnitude lower than calculated and no paranormal effects were observed. Both Taylor and Balanovski wrote their results were a strong argument against the validity of telepathy.

Research in anomalistic psychology has discovered that in some cases telepathy can be explained by a covariation bias. In an experiment (Schienle et al. 1996) 22 believers and 20 skeptics were asked to judge the covariation between transmitted symbols and the corresponding feedback given by a receiver. According to the results the believers overestimated the number of successful transmissions whilst the skeptics made accurate hit judgments. The results from another telepathy experiment involving 48 undergraduate college students (Rudski, 2002) were explained by hindsight and confirmation biases.

In 1995, Rupert Sheldrake published his book on alleged telepathic phenomena Seven Experiments That Could Change the World, claiming among other things that dogs have the telepathic ability to know when their owners are coming home. In 1998, Richard Wiseman, Matthew Smith and Julie Milton published a paper putting forward other explanations for the behavior Sheldrake observed in animals while saying the results from their own experiments did not support Sheldrake's thesis.

== In parapsychology ==
Within parapsychology, telepathy, often along with precognition and clairvoyance, is described as an aspect of extrasensory perception (ESP) or "anomalous cognition" that parapsychologists believe is transferred through a hypothetical psychic mechanism they call "psi". Parapsychologists have reported experiments they use to test for telepathic abilities. Among the most well known are the use of Zener cards and the Ganzfeld experiment.

=== Types ===
Several forms of telepathy have been suggested:

- Latent telepathy, formerly known as "deferred telepathy", describes a transfer of information with an observable time-lag between transmission and reception.
- Retrocognitive, precognitive, and intuitive telepathy describes the transfer of information about the past, future or present state of an individual's mind to another individual.
- Emotive telepathy, also known as remote influence or emotional transfer, describes the transfer of kinesthetic sensations through altered states.
- Superconscious telepathy describes use of the supposed superconscious to access the collective wisdom of the human species for knowledge.

=== Zener cards ===
Zener cards

Zener cards are marked with five distinctive symbols. When using them, one individual is designated the "sender" and another the "receiver". The sender selects a random card and visualizes the symbol on it, while the receiver attempts to determine that symbol telepathically. Statistically, the receiver has a 20% chance of randomly guessing the correct symbol, so to demonstrate telepathy, they must repeatedly score a success rate that is significantly higher than 20%. If not conducted properly, this method is vulnerable to sensory leakage and card counting.

J. B. Rhine's experiments with Zener cards were discredited due to the discovery that sensory leakage or cheating could account for all his results such as the subject being able to read the symbols from the back of the cards and being able to see and hear the experimenter to note subtle clues. Once Rhine took precautions in response to criticisms of his methods, he was unable to find any high-scoring subjects. Due to the methodological problems, parapsychologists no longer utilize card-guessing studies.

=== Dream telepathy ===
Parapsychological studies into dream telepathy were carried out at the Maimonides Medical Center in Brooklyn, New York led by Stanley Krippner and Montague Ullman. They concluded the results from some of their experiments supported dream telepathy. However, the results have not been independently replicated. The psychologist James Alcock has written the dream telepathy experiments at Maimonides have failed to provide evidence for telepathy and "lack of replication is rampant."

The picture target experiments that were conducted by Krippner and Ullman were criticized by C. E. M. Hansel. According to Hansel there were weaknesses in the design of the experiments in the way in which the agent became aware of their target picture. Only the agent should have known the target and no other person until the judging of targets had been completed, however, an experimenter was with the agent when the target envelope was opened. Hansel also wrote there had been poor controls in the experiment as the main experimenter could communicate with the subject.

An attempt to replicate the experiments that used picture targets was carried out by Edward Belvedere and David Foulkes. The finding was that neither the subject nor the judges matched the targets with dreams above chance level. Results from other experiments by Belvedere and Foulkes were also negative.

=== Ganzfeld experiment ===
When using the Ganzfeld experiment to test for telepathy, one individual is designated as the receiver and is placed inside a controlled environment where they are deprived of sensory input, and another person is designated as the sender and is placed in a separate location. The receiver is then required to receive information from the sender. The nature of the information may vary between experiments.

The Ganzfeld experiment studies that were examined by Ray Hyman and Charles Honorton had methodological problems that were well documented. Honorton reported only 36% of the studies used duplicate target sets of pictures to avoid handling cues. Hyman discovered flaws in all of the 42 Ganzfeld experiments and to access each experiment, he devised a set of 12 categories of flaws. Six of these concerned statistical defects, the other six covered procedural flaws such as inadequate documentation, randomization and security as well as possibilities of sensory leakage. Over half of the studies failed to safeguard against sensory leakage and all of the studies contained at least one of the 12 flaws. Because of the flaws, Honorton agreed with Hyman the 42 Ganzfeld studies could not support the claim for the existence of psi.

Possibilities of sensory leakage in the Ganzfeld experiments included the receivers hearing what was going on in the sender's room next door as the rooms were not soundproof and the sender's fingerprints to be visible on the target object for the receiver to see.

Hyman also reviewed the autoganzfeld experiments and discovered a pattern in the data that implied a visual cue may have taken place:

The most suspicious pattern was that the hit rate for a given target increased with the frequency of occurrence of that target in the experiment. The hit rate for the targets that occurred only once was right at the chance expectation of 25%. For targets that appeared twice the hit rate crept up to 28%. For those that occurred three times it was 38%, and for those targets that occurred six or more times, the hit rate was 52%. Each time a videotape is played its quality can degrade. It is plausible then, that when a frequently used clip is the target for a given session, it may be physically distinguishable from the other three decoy clips that are presented to the subject for judging. Surprisingly, the parapsychological community has not taken this finding seriously. They still include the autoganzfeld series in their meta-analyses and treat it as convincing evidence for the reality of psi.

Hyman wrote the autoganzfeld experiments were flawed because they did not preclude the possibility of sensory leakage. In 2010, Lance Storm, Patrizio Tressoldi, and Lorenzo Di Risio analyzed 29 ganzfeld studies from 1997 to 2008. Of the 1,498 trials, 483 produced hits, corresponding to a hit rate of 32.2%. This hit rate is statistically significant with p < .001. Participants selected for personality traits and personal characteristics thought to be psi-conducive were found to perform significantly better than unselected participants in the ganzfeld condition. Hyman (2010) published a rebuttal to Storm et al. According to Hyman "reliance on meta-analysis as the sole basis for justifying the claim that an anomaly exists and that the evidence for it is consistent and replicable is fallacious. It distorts what scientists mean by confirmatory evidence." Hyman wrote the ganzfeld studies have not been independently replicated and have failed to produce evidence for telepathy. Storm et al. published a response to Hyman claiming the ganzfeld experimental design has proved to be consistent and reliable but parapsychology is a struggling discipline that has not received much attention so further research on the subject is necessary. Rouder et al. 2013 wrote that critical evaluation of Storm et al.'s meta-analysis reveals no evidence for telepathy, no plausible mechanism and omitted replication failures. A 2016 paper examined questionable research practices in the ganzfeld experiments.

=== Twin telepathy ===
Twin telepathy is a belief that has been described as a myth in psychological literature. Psychologists Stephen Hupp and Jeremy Jewell have noted that all experiments on the subject have failed to provide any scientific evidence for telepathy between twins. According to Hupp and Jewell there are various behavioral and genetic factors that contribute to the twin telepathy myth "identical twins typically spend a lot of time together and are usually exposed to very similar environments. Thus, it's not at all surprising that they act in similar ways and are adept at anticipating and forecasting each other's reactions to events."

A 1993 study by Susan Blackmore investigated the claims of twin telepathy. In an experiment with six sets of twins one subject would act as the sender and the other the receiver. The sender was given selected objects, photographs or numbers and would attempt to psychically send the information to the receiver. The results from the experiment were negative, no evidence of telepathy was observed.

The skeptical investigator Benjamin Radford has noted that "Despite decades of research trying to prove telepathy, there is no credible scientific evidence that psychic powers exist, either in the general population or among twins specifically. The idea that two people who shared their mother's womb—or even who share the same DNA—have a mysterious mental connection is an intriguing one not borne out in science."

== Scientific reception ==
A variety of tests have been performed to demonstrate telepathy, but there is no scientific evidence that the power exists. A panel commissioned by the United States National Research Council to study paranormal claims concluded that "despite a 130-year record of scientific research on such matters, our committee could find no scientific justification for the existence of phenomena such as extrasensory perception, mental telepathy or 'mind over matter' exercises... Evaluation of a large body of the best available evidence simply does not support the contention that these phenomena exist." The scientific community considers parapsychology a pseudoscience. There is no known mechanism for telepathy. Philosopher and physicist Mario Bunge has written that telepathy would contradict laws of science and the claim that "signals can be transmitted across space without fading with distance is inconsistent with physics".

Physicist John Taylor has written that the experiments that have been claimed by parapsychologists to support evidence for the existence of telepathy are based on the use of shaky statistical analysis and poor design, and attempts to duplicate such experiments by the scientific community have failed. Taylor also wrote the arguments used by parapsychologists for the feasibility of such phenomena are based on distortions of theoretical physics as well as "complete ignorance" of relevant areas of physics.

Psychologist Stuart Sutherland wrote that cases of telepathy can be explained by people underestimating the probability of coincidences. According to Sutherland, "most stories about this phenomenon concern people who are close to one another—husband and wife or brother and sister. Since such people have much in common, it is highly probable that they will sometimes think the same thought at the same time." Graham Reed, a specialist in anomalistic psychology, noted that experiments into telepathy often involve the subject relaxing and reporting the 'messages' to consist of colored geometric shapes. Reed wrote that these are a common type of hypnagogic image and not evidence for telepathic communication.

Outside of parapsychology, telepathy is generally explained as the result of fraud, self-delusion and/or self-deception and not as a paranormal power. Psychological research has also revealed other explanations such as confirmation bias, expectancy bias, sensory leakage, subjective validation, and wishful thinking. Virtually all of the instances of more popular psychic phenomena, such as mediumship, can be attributed to non-paranormal techniques such as cold reading. Magicians such as Ian Rowland and Derren Brown have demonstrated techniques and results similar to those of popular psychics, albeit without claiming paranormal skills. They have identified, described, and developed psychological techniques of cold reading and hot reading.

== Psychiatry ==
The notion of telepathy is not dissimilar to three clinical concepts: delusions of thought insertion/removal and thought broadcasting. This similarity might explain how an individual might come to the conclusion that he or she were experiencing telepathy. Thought insertion/removal is a symptom of psychosis, particularly of schizophrenia, schizoaffective disorder or substance-induced psychosis. Psychiatric patients who experience this symptom falsely believe that some of their thoughts are not their own and that others (e.g., other people, aliens, demons or fallen angels, or conspiring intelligence agencies, or artificial intelligences) are putting thoughts into their minds (thought insertion). Some patients feel as if thoughts are being taken out of their minds or deleted (thought removal). Schizophrenic patients suffering from the form of alleged telepathy known as thought broadcasting believe that their private thoughts are being broadcast to other people against their informed consent. Along with other symptoms of psychosis, delusions of thought insertion may be reduced by antipsychotic medication. Psychiatrists and clinical psychologists believe and empirical findings support the idea that people with schizotypy and schizotypal personality disorder are particularly likely to believe in telepathy.

== Use in fiction ==
Telepathy is a common theme in science fiction.

== See also ==
- Brain–brain interface
- Extended Mind, the concept that things frequently used by the mind become part of it.
- Ishin-denshin, traditional Japanese concept of unspoken mutual understanding, sometimes translated as "telepathy".
- Lady Wonder, a horse that appeared to answer questions.
- Microwave auditory effect for hearing and subvocal recognition for speaking.
- Synthetic telepathy
