= Rosa Mary Barrett =

English social reformer (1854–1936)

- Born: 15 January 1854; Royston, Hertfordshire, England
- Died: 28 August 1936 (aged 82); Welwyn Garden City, Hertfordshire, England
- Occupations: Philanthropist; child care reformer; suffragist
- Relatives: William F. Barrett (brother)

Rosa Mary Barrett (15 January 1854 – 28 August 1936) (Note: Also cited as 1855.) was an English philanthropist, child care reformer and suffragist active in Dublin.

== Biography ==
Barrett was born on 15 January 1854 in Royston, Hertfordshire (Note: Also cited as the Colony of Jamaica.) to the Reverend William Garland Barrett (1812–1865), a Congregational Minister and missionary for the London Missionary Society, and Martha Barrett (née Fletcher; c. 1811–1893). The youngest of four surviving children, Barrett was the sister of the physicist William F. Barrett.

Barrett moved to Monkstown, Co. Dublin and then to Kingstown (now Dún Laoghaire), Co. Dublin, in Ireland. In 1879 she helped set up a committee for the establishment of a care facility for children, effectively a creche allowing women to enter the workforce. It eventually led to the establishment of The Cottage Home for Little Children which housed Protestant children. To avoid accusations of proselytising, the home did not accept Catholic children.

Rosa Barrett founded the Irish section of the National Society for the Prevention of Cruelty to Children in 1889. On 28 August 1936, Barrett died at her home in Welwyn Garden City, Hertfordshire.

== Published works ==
- — (1884). Guide to Dublin charities. Dublin: Hodges, Figgis & Co.
- — (August 1892). "Legislation on behalf of neglected children in America and elsewhere". Journal of the Statistical and Social Inquiry Society of Ireland. 72 (9): 616–636.
- — (December 1895). "The rescue of the young". The Humanitarian. London: Humanitarian League / Ernest Bell. OCLC 977754943.
- — (August 1896). "Further details as regards Foreign legislation on behalf of destitute and neglected children". Journal of the Statistical and Social Inquiry Society of Ireland. 76 (10): 143-215.
- — (February 1900). "Crime in Ireland". The Humanitarian. London: Humanitarian League / Ernest Bell. OCLC 977754943. summarized in "Notes & comments". The Christian. No. 1569. 22 February 1900. p. 9.
- — (June 1900). "Pensions for aged women". The Humanitarian. 16. London: Humanitarian League / Ernest Bell: 430–432. OCLC 977754943.
- — (June 1900). "The treatment of juvenile offenders: Together with statistics of their numbers" (PDF). Journal of the Royal Statistical Society. 63 (2): 183–271. doi:10.2307/2979656. JSTOR 2979656.
- Flandrin, M. Paul; — (1902). "The reform of young criminals: With special reference to Great Britain". Report of the Proceedings of the Third International Congress for the Welfare and Protection of Children. London: P. S. King & Son. pp. 135–143. OCLC 24683234.
- Gibbons, J. S.; — (1906). Inebriety and crime, with some state remedies : reprints of papers presented to the International Congress on Prison Management (otherwise called the International Quinquennial Penitentiary Congress), held at Buda-Pesth, September, 1905. Dublin: Hodges Figgis, & Co., Ltd. OCLC 1418918012.
- — (October 1906). "Children's trials, courts, and child prisoners". Progress: Civic, Social, Industrial (4). British Institute of Social Service: 259–273.
- — (1907). Ellice Hopkins: A memoir. London: Wells Gardiner & Co.
- — (January 1908). "Chips from social workshops". Progress: Civic, Social, Industrial. Vol. 3, no. 1. British Institute of Social Service. p. 197-198.
- — (January 1908). "Fifty years of child legislation". Progress: Civic, Social, Industrial. 3 (1). British Institute of Social Service: 262–.
- — (1910). "The Children's Act". Proceedings of Annual Congress of the American Prison Association: 353–354.
- — (12 May 1917). "The 'trade' and the nation". The Spectator: A weekly review of politics, literature, theology, and art (Letter to the editor). Vol. 118, no. 4637. London: Alfred Everson. pp. 538–539.
- Barrett, William Fletcher; — (1925). The religion of health: An examination of Christian science. London: J. M. Dent & Sons, Ltd. ASIN B00H34HGLM. OCLC 4479993. Republished as Christian science: An examination of the religion of health. New York: Henry Holt. 1925. OCLC 17667358.
