= Washington Irving Bishop =

American magician (1855–1889)

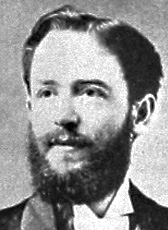
- Born: March 4, 1855
- Died: May 13, 1889 (aged 34); New York, New York, U.S.
- Occupation: Mentalist

Washington Irving Bishop, also known as Wellington (4 March 1855 – 13 May 1889) was an American stage mentalist. He started his career as an assistant under the muscle reader J. Randall Brown, but was most well known for his performance of the blindfold drive.

== Career ==
Bishop was born in 1855. In the early 1870s, Bishop was the manager of Anna Eva Fay's spiritualist acts, but in 1876, he exposed her trick methods in New York's Daily Graphic newspaper. His article accused the physicist and spiritualist William Crookes of being duped by Fay. Crookes defended Fay in a letter that was printed in the article. Bishop began performing the Fay act to the public with an explanation for all her tricks and wrote a book exposing the trick methods used by some psychics.

Bishop later became interested in thought-reading after he attended a show by J. Randall Brown. Brown later hired him as an assistant.

In 1880, he published a one shilling book called Second Sight Explained.

During his shows similar to Brown, Bishop would ask a member of his audience for an object to be hidden in a secret location, he would then hold the hand or wrist of the person and ask them to think of its location. Bishop would then search to find the object. Bishop performed such famous "thought reading" demonstrations all over the world. He claimed no supernatural powers and ascribed his powers to muscular sensitivity (reading thoughts from unconscious bodily cues, or ideomotor phenomena). Bishop is also credited with inventing the "blindfold drive", where he would navigate using a horse and carriage while blindfolded.

He arrived in London in 1881 where he was tested by William Benjamin Carpenter who commented that his talent may be great use to the study of psychology. George Romanes noted that Bishop was "guided by the indications unconsciously given through the muscles of his subjects." Oliver Lodge reported that Bishop came to Liverpool in 1883 and performed by having an audience member hide a pin, return to the blindfolded Bishop on the stage, and using "thought-transference" to guide the member back to the pin.

=== Claims of supernatural abilities ===
Despite exposing spiritualism in 1876, Bishop later claimed to have supernatural abilities. Bishop claimed to have been tested by scientists, however he did not pass tests when the conditions were not designed by himself. The magician John Nevil Maskelyne objected to Bishop's claims of supernatural abilities, which provoked defamatory statements in return. Maskelyne won a lawsuit against Bishop, and Bishop left England in order to avoid paying the penalty.

== Death ==
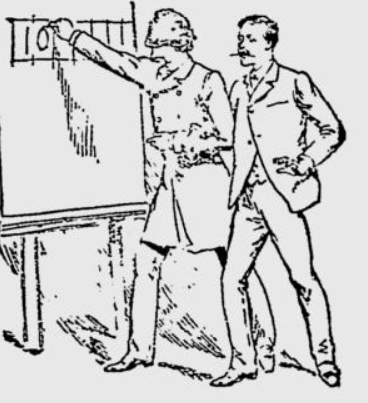
Bishop (left) blindfolded attempting to identify a number by muscle reading.

On May 12, 1889, Bishop became unconscious for the second time in one of his demonstrations while performing at the New York City theatrical society known as The Lambs Club. He was taken upstairs to a bedroom, where he was reported to have been in a coma and died at noon the next day. However, Bishop was alleged to have suffered from cataleptic fits, remaining in a trance state for many hours, he even carried a card on him that explained no autopsy should be performed on him until at least after 48 hours. The card was never found on his body.

On May 13, the physicians John A. Irwin, Frank Ferguson and Irwin H. Hance who had examined Bishop, performed an unauthorized autopsy on him at a funeral home. John A. Irwin was reported to have wanted to study Bishop's brain with an autopsy for years. Bishop's death certificate gave the cause of death as hysterocatalepsy.

Bishop's mother Eleanor and his wife both claimed that he was not dead, but in a trance state whilst the physicians examined his body. They claimed that he was murdered by surgical instruments during the autopsy. They alleged that he had suffered from cataleptic attacks and could remain in trance up to 52 hours. These claims were denied by physicians who had examined the body. Eleanor brought charges against the physicians but the case ended in a hung jury and nobody was charged.

=== Burial ===
Bishop is buried in Brooklyn's Green-Wood Cemetery. As a tribute to the son she believed was murdered, Eleanor Fletcher Bishop had the inscription "The Martyr" carved above his name on his headstone.

== Publications ==
- Wicks, Frederick; Bishop, Washington Irving (1880). Second Sight Explained: A Complete Exposition of Clairvoyance or Second Sight. New York?. p. 90.
- Bishop, Washington Irving (1886). Thought Reading. p. 12.
- Bishop, Eleanor Fletcher (1889). A mother's life dedicated, and an appeal for justice to all brother Masons and the generous public : a synopsis of the butchery of the late Sir Washington Irving Bishop (Kamilimilianalani), a most worthy Mason of the thirty-second degree, the mind reader, and philanthropist. p. 146.
- Skinner, William E. (1895). Wehman's wizards' manual; a practical treatise on mind reading, according to Stuart Cumberland and the late Washington Irving Bishop; ventriloquism, as practised by Valentine Vox and others; sleight of hand; secrets and methods of performing many marvelous mysteries, such as have astonished the public of all nations. Wehman Bros. p. 90.
- Thought Reading, Second Sight & Spiritual Manifestations Explained: Showing How the Supposed Phenomena are Produced by Natural Means (1907)
