= Stuart Cumberland =

English mentalist

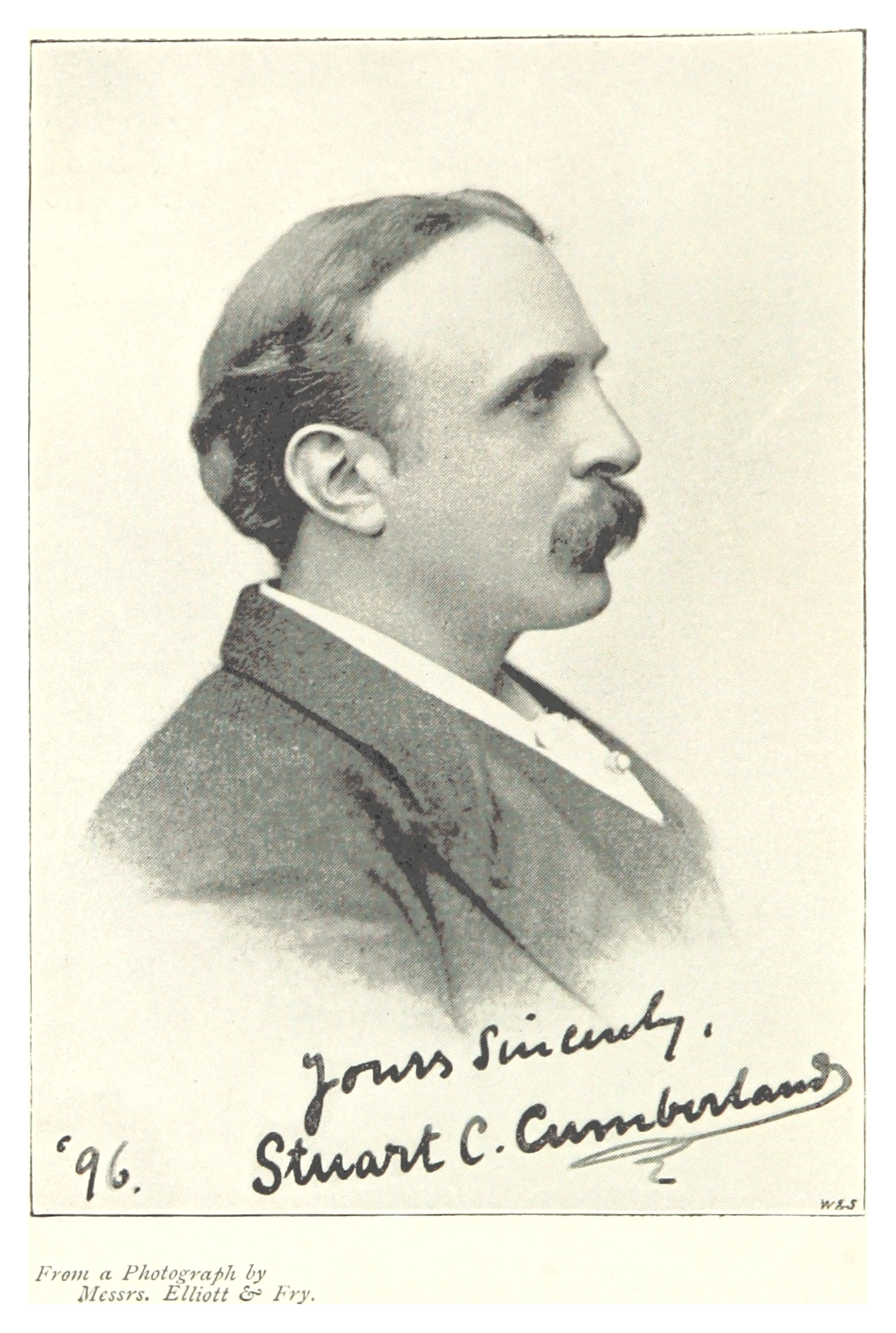
Stuard C. Cumberland (1896)

Stuart Cumberland (1857–1922) was an English mentalist known for his demonstrations of "thought reading".

Cumberland was famous for performing blindfolded feats such as identifying a hidden object in a room that a person had picked out or asking someone to imagine a murder scene and then attempt to read the subject's thoughts and identify the victim and re-enact the crime. Cumberland claimed to possess no genuine psychic ability and his thought reading performances could only be demonstrated by holding the hand of his subject to read their muscular movements. He came into dispute with psychical researchers associated with the Society for Psychical Research who were searching for genuine cases of telepathy. Cumberland argued that both telepathy and communication with the dead were impossible and that the mind of man can not be read through telepathy, only by muscle reading.

An opponent of spiritualism, Cumberland would attribute all mediumship phenomena to muscle reading and trickery.

== Publications ==
- A Thought Reader's Thoughts (1888)
- People I Have Read (1905)
- That Other World (1918)
- Spiritualism: The Inside Truth (1919)
