= List of actuality films by Georges Méliès =

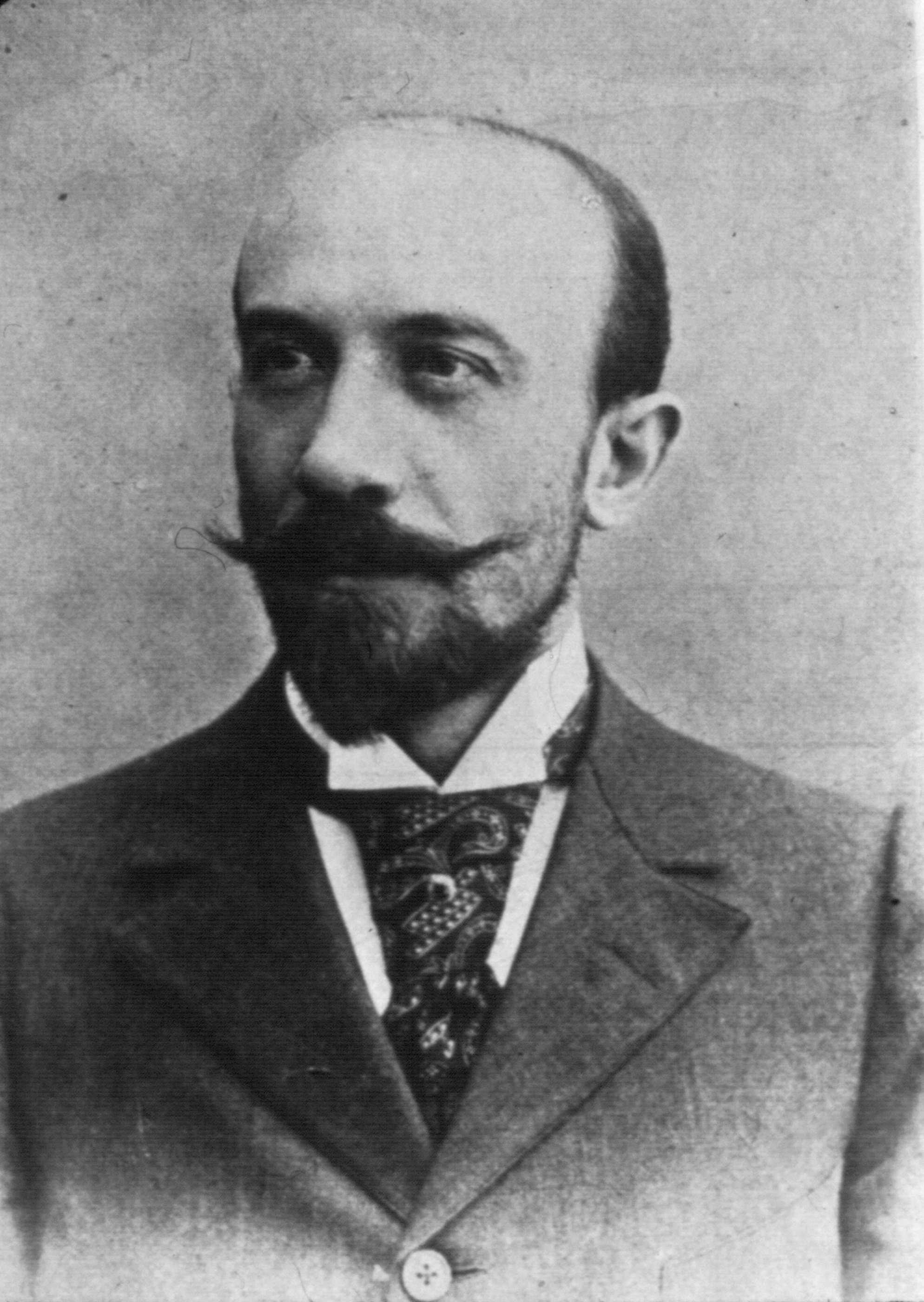
Georges Méliès

Georges Méliès (1861–1938), a French filmmaker and magician, made a variety of short actuality films between 1896 and 1900. Méliès was established as a magician with his own theater-of-illusions, the Théâtre Robert-Houdin in Paris, when he attended the celebrated first public demonstration of the Lumière Brothers' Kinetoscope in December 1895. Unable to purchase a camera from the Lumières, who insisted that the venture had no future, he bought a film projector and some films from the British film experimenter Robert W. Paul and began projecting them at the Théâtre Robert-Houdin. Meanwhile, Méliès studied the principles on which Paul's projector ran, and in 1896 was able to modify the machine so that it could be used as a makeshift camera. At first, Méliès followed the custom of the time, and the example memorably set by the pioneering Lumières, by producing actuality films—brief "slice of life" incidents made by preparing naturalistic scenes for the camera or by filming events of the day. These "cityscapes, scenic views, and domestic vignettes" closely followed the model already set by the Lumières and their salaried operators, who had already been sent to various points abroad to publicize the Lumière camera and bring home actualities filmed in foreign climes. All told, Méliès filmed 93 films, or 18% of his entire output, outdoors as actuality footage.

However, Méliès was also interested in expanding his line of films to include less common genres. His second film, Conjuring, captured a theatrical magic act on film; his sixth, Watering the Flowers, moved into comedy, remaking the Lumière's influential L'Arroseur Arrosé. Following his discovery of the substitution splice in 1896, Méliès moved further into fiction and trick films, building his own studio on his property in Montreuil, Seine-Saint-Denis to allow for the filming of his theatrically inspired, storytelling-based scènes composées—"artificially arranged scenes." His last nonfiction work was the seventeen-part Paris Exposition, 1900 film series. Because of his move away from actualities into fiction, he is generally regarded as the first person to recognize the potential of narrative film. In an advertisement, Méliès proudly described the difference between his innovative theatrical films and the actualities still being made by his contemporaries: "these fantastic and artistic films reproduce stage scenes and create a new genre entirely different from the ordinary cinematographic views of real people and real streets."

== Films ==
The following guide to Méliès's actuality films lists the numbers assigned in the catalogues of Méliès's studio, the Star Film Company; the original French and English titles; the presumed filming date; and whether the film survives or is presumed lost. Unless otherwise referenced, this data comes from Jacques Malthête's 2008 filmography of the films of Georges Méliès. Wherever possible, brief summaries of the films are given; unless otherwise cited, these are extrapolated from the available French and English titles.

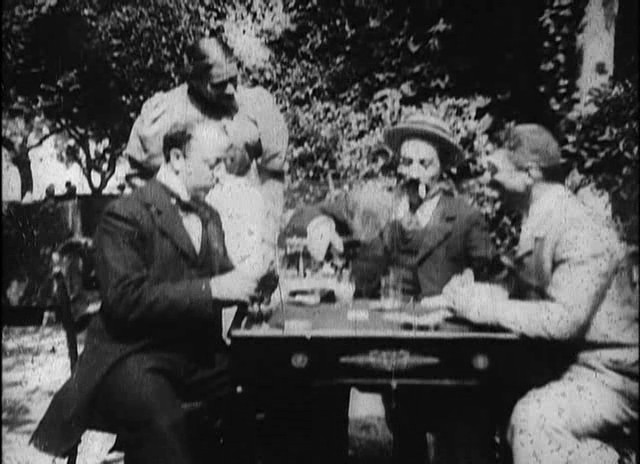
Méliès (third from left) and friends in film 1

Edison panoramic film of the Place de l'Opéra in 1900, shortly after it was featured in films 10, 17, and 139

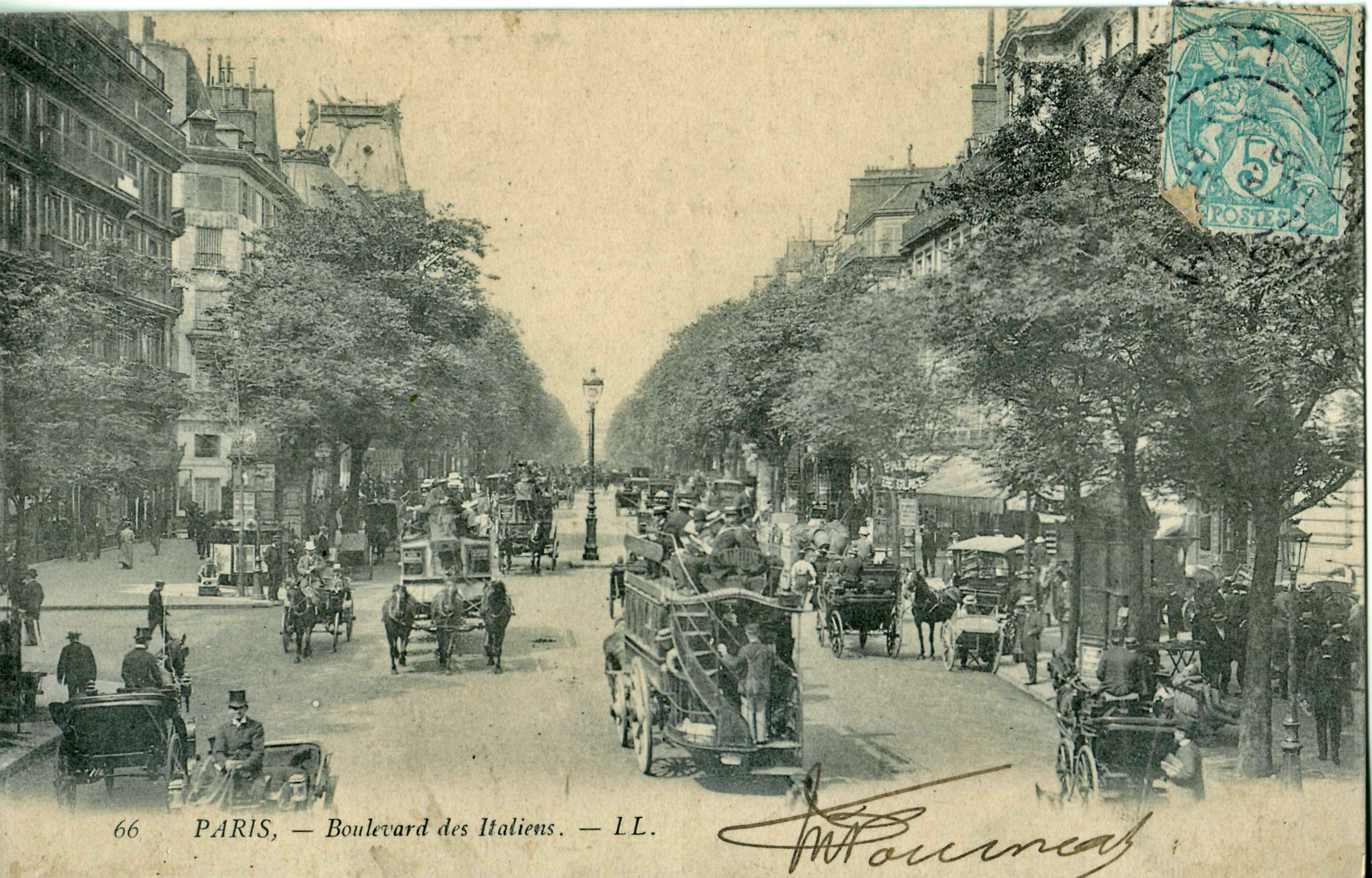
Postcard of the Boulevard des Italiens, the location for films 18 and 85

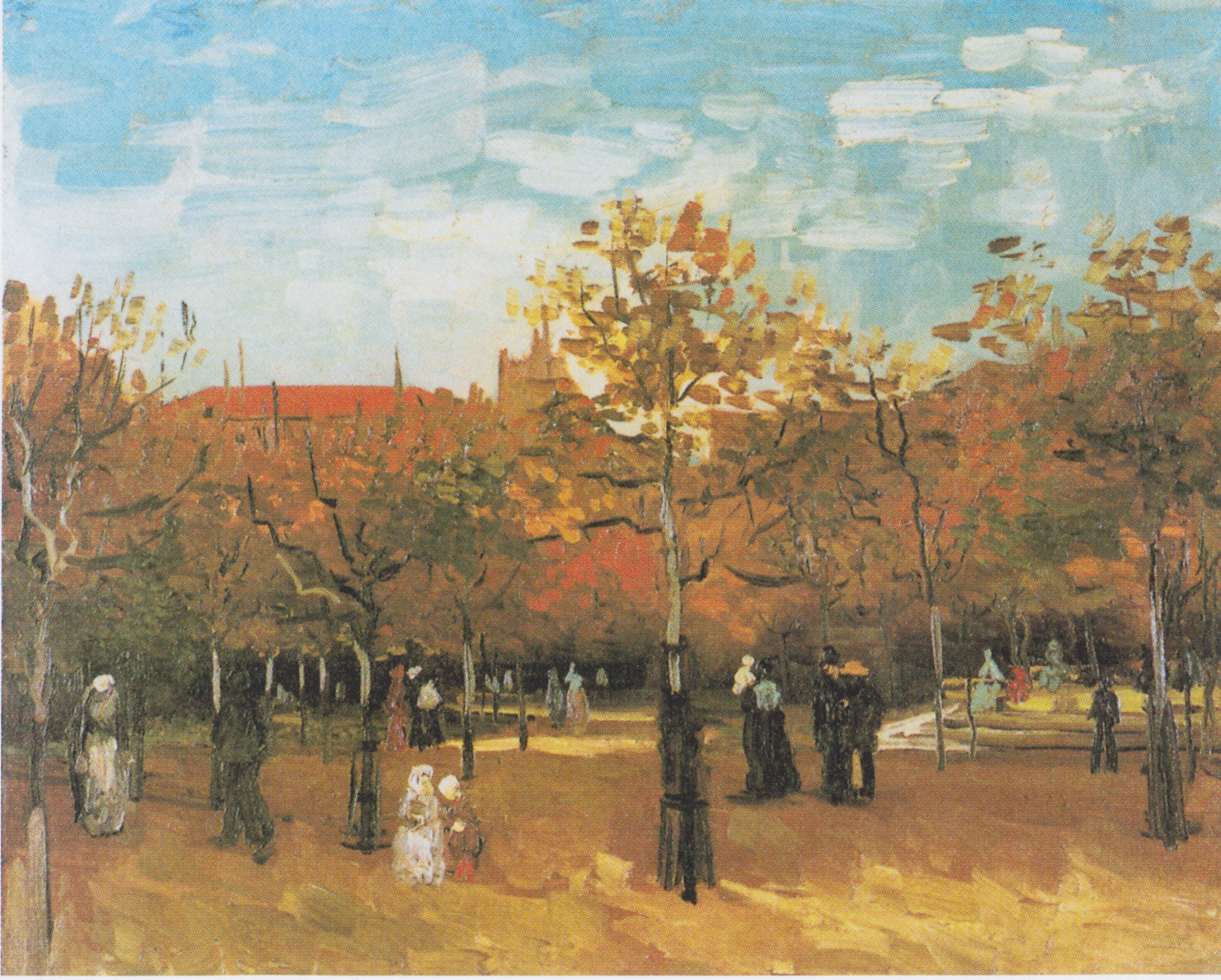
An 1886 Van Gogh view of the Bois de Boulogne, where films 20, 21, and 50 were made

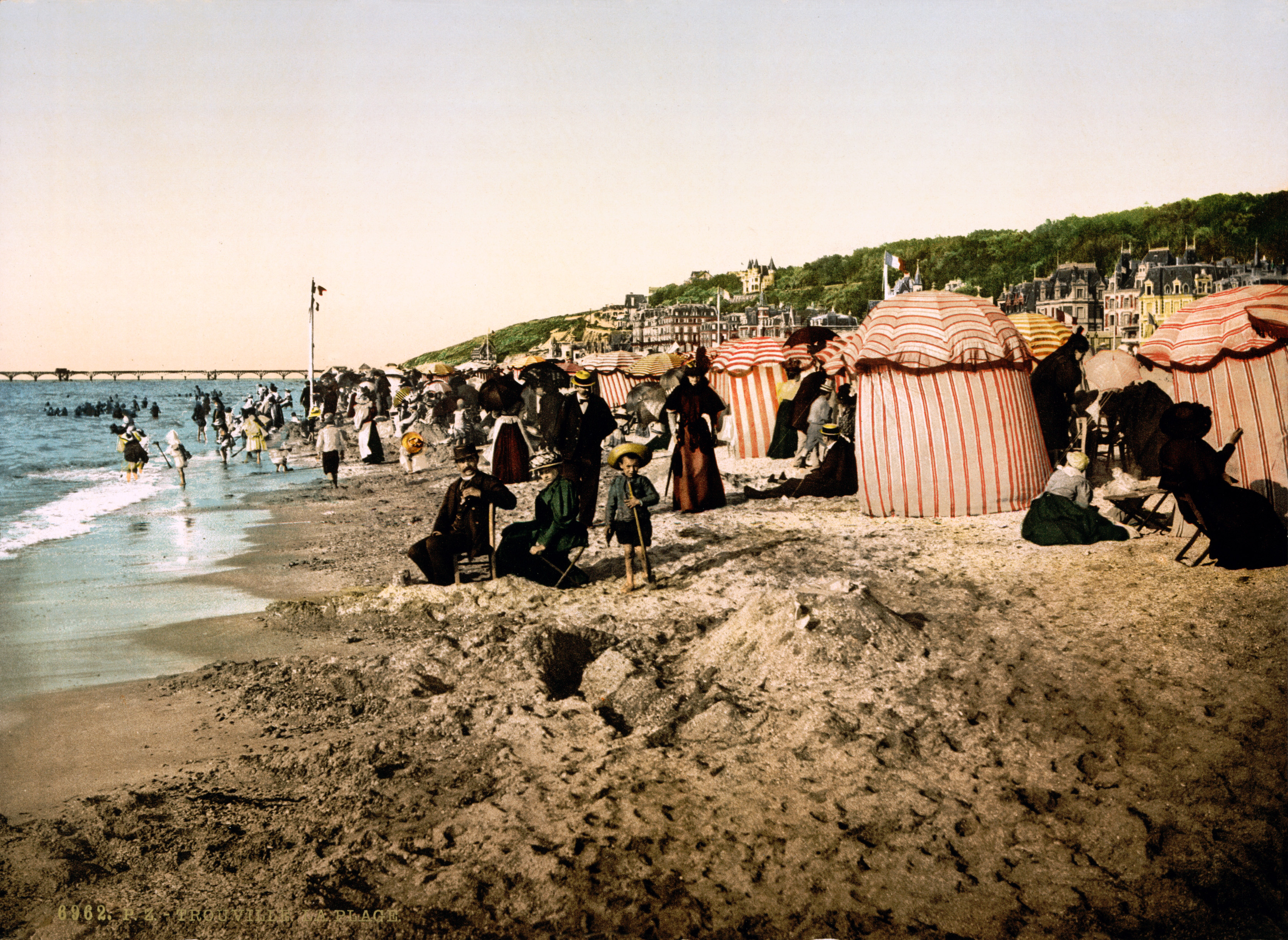
The beach at Trouville-sur-Mer, around the time of films 30 through 33

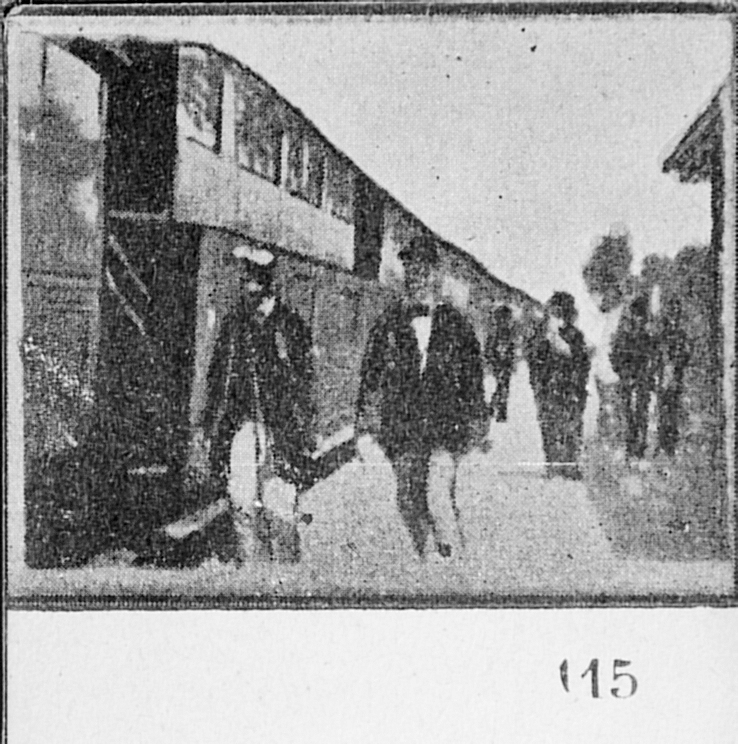
Page from the flipbook of film 35

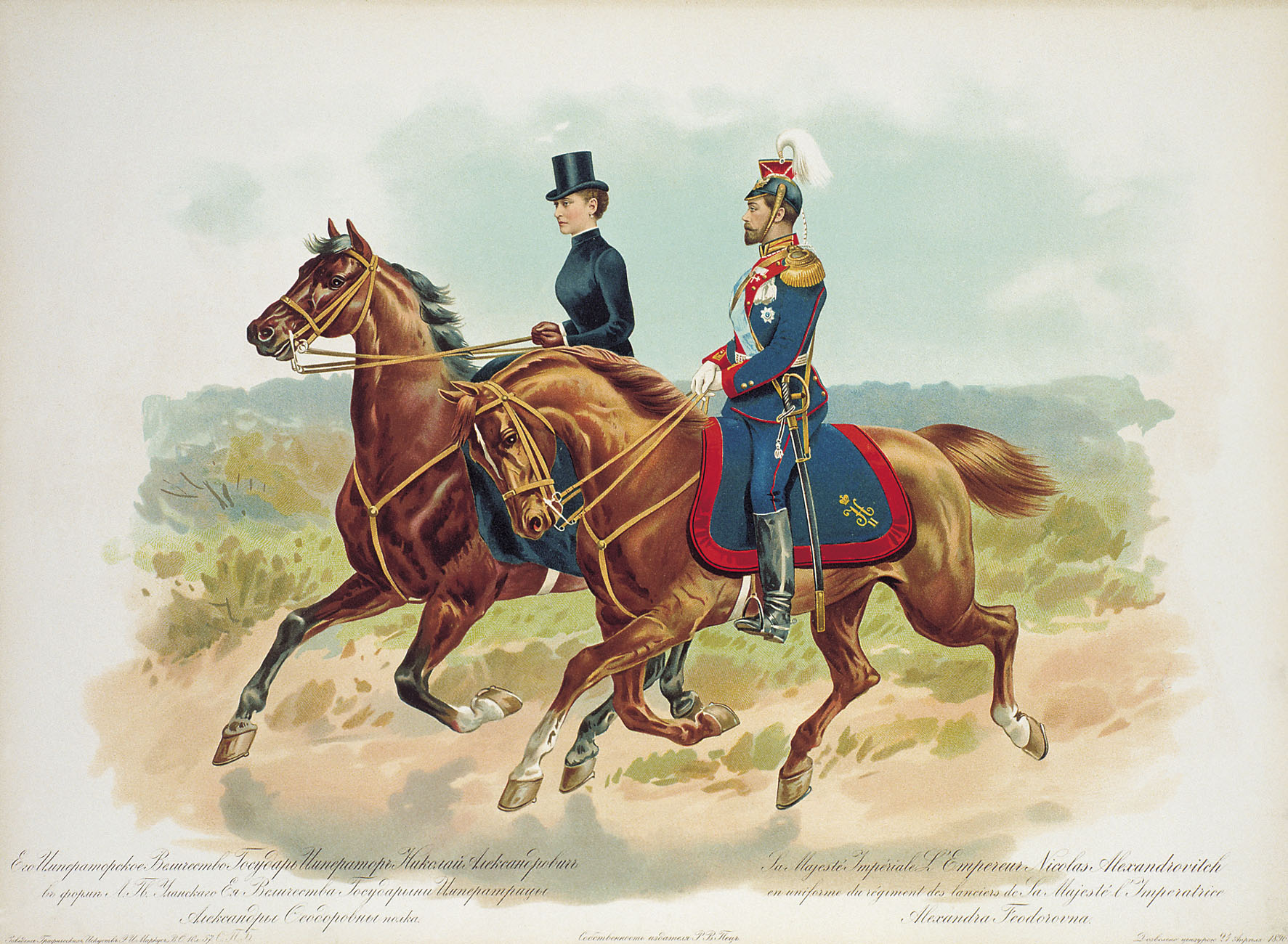
Alexandra Feodorovna and Nicholas II of Russia, shortly before their visit to France documented in films 48 and 50

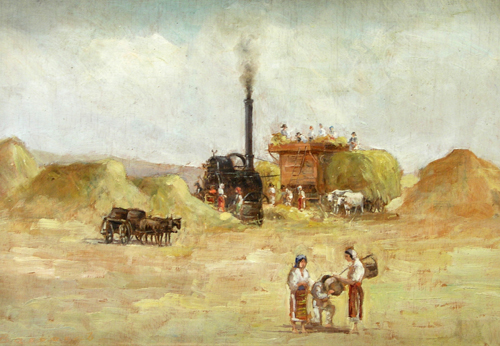
A steam-powered threshing machine; Méliès showed one in film 65

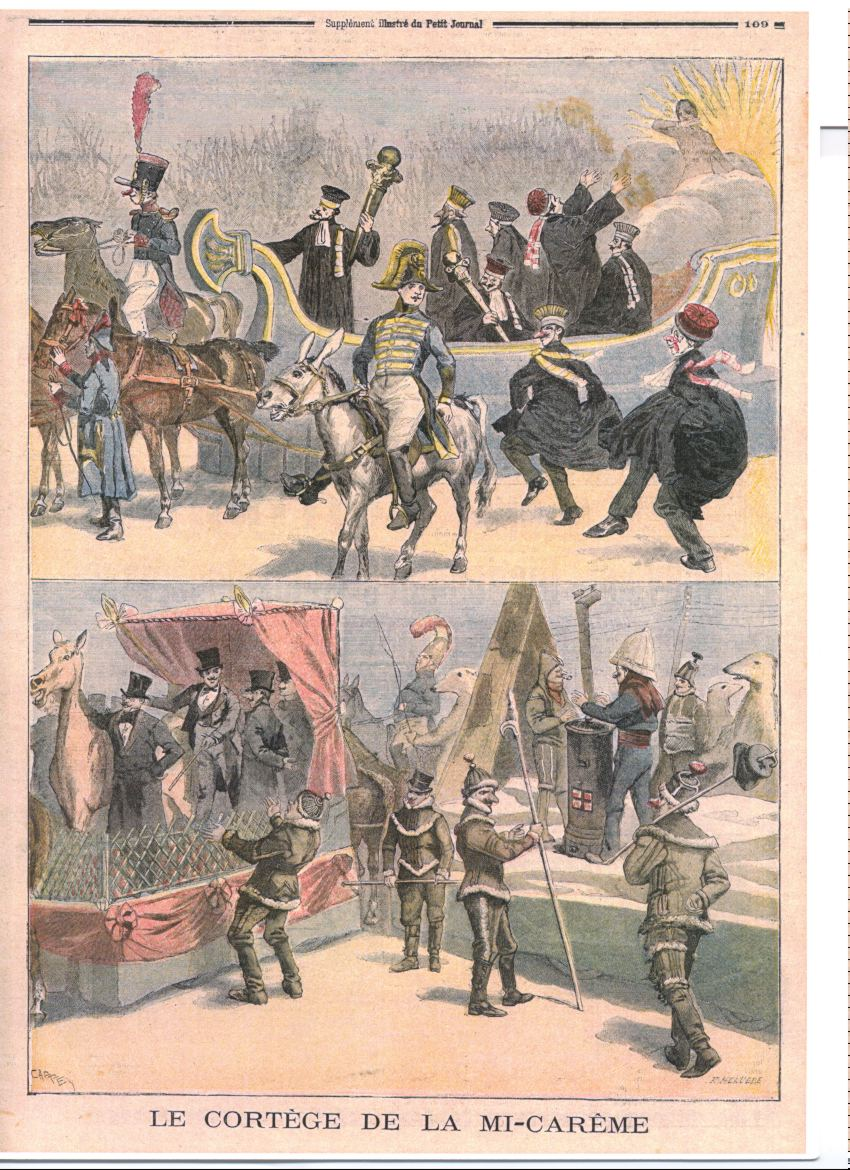
Drawings of the 1897 Mid-Lent parade shown in film 97–98

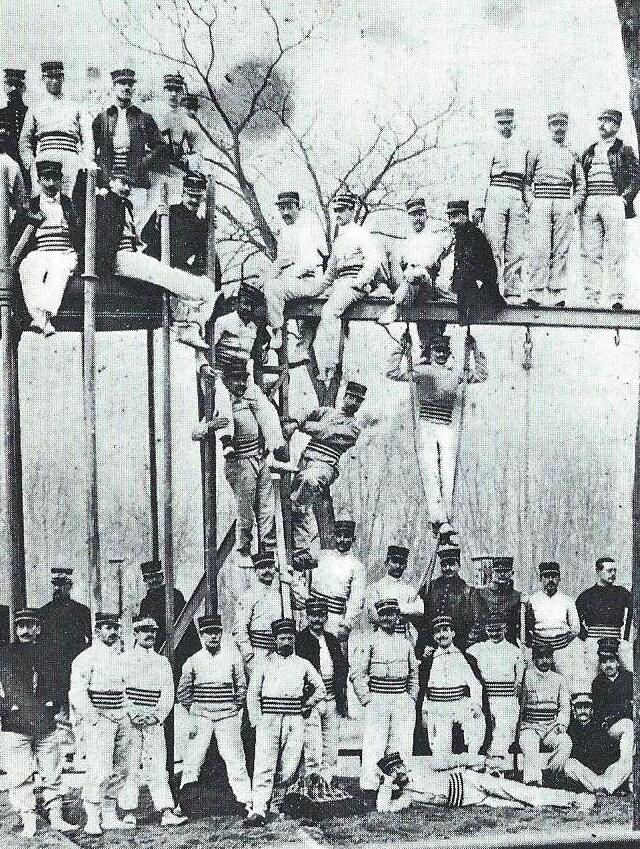
Students at the École de Joinville, around the time Méliès made films 136 and 148 there

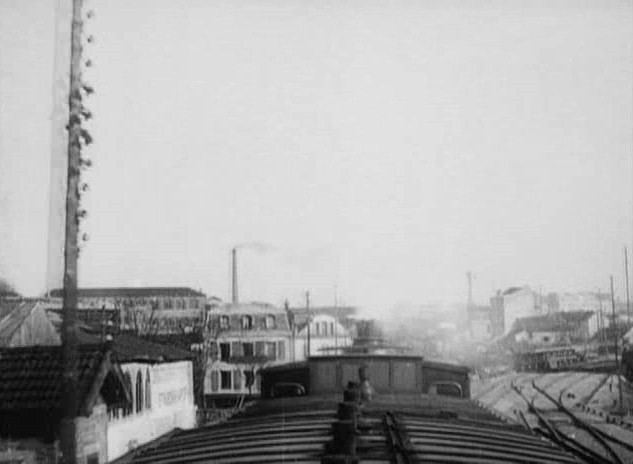
Frame from film 151

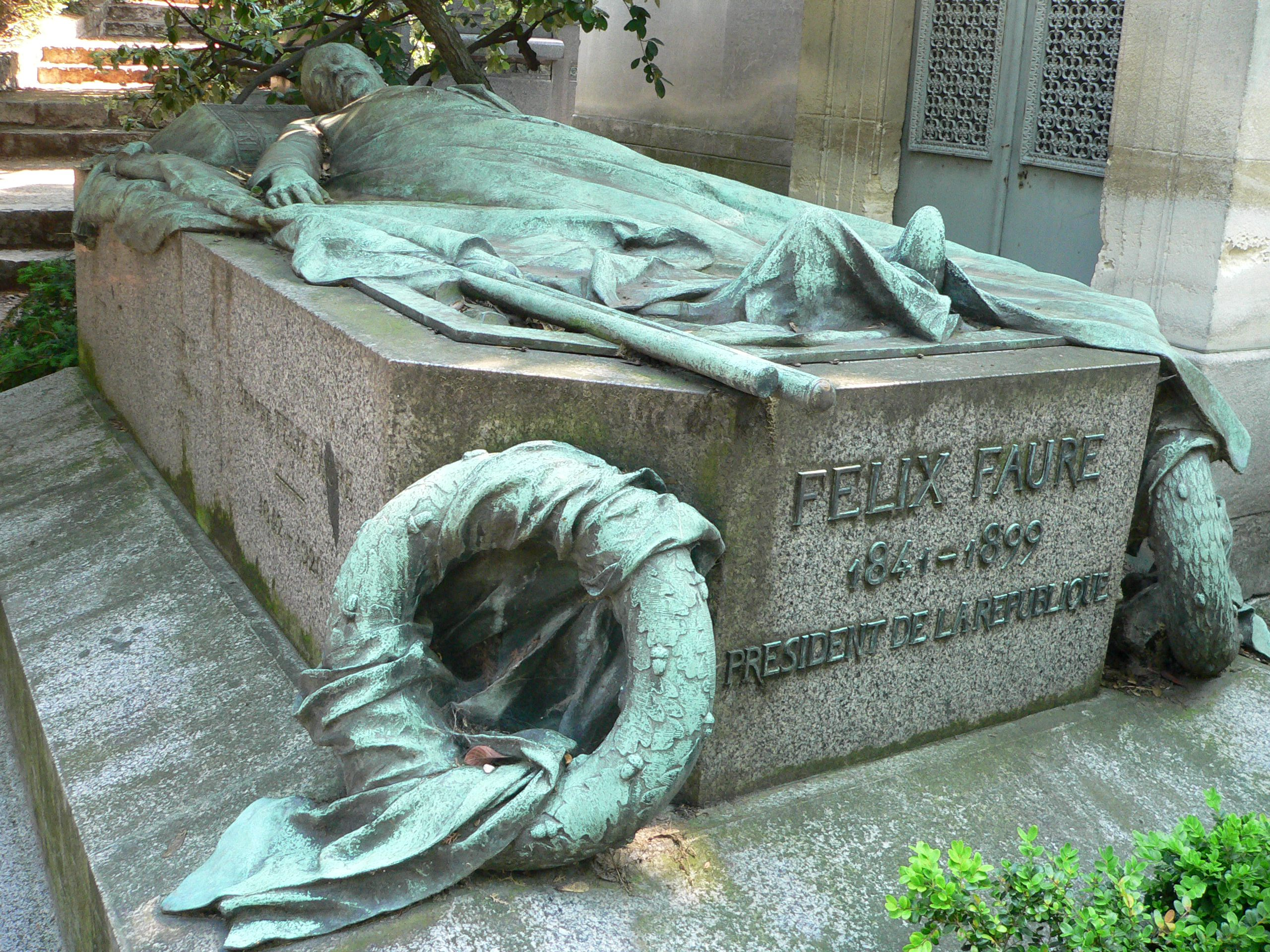
Grave of Félix Faure: Méliès showed the funeral procession in film 173–174

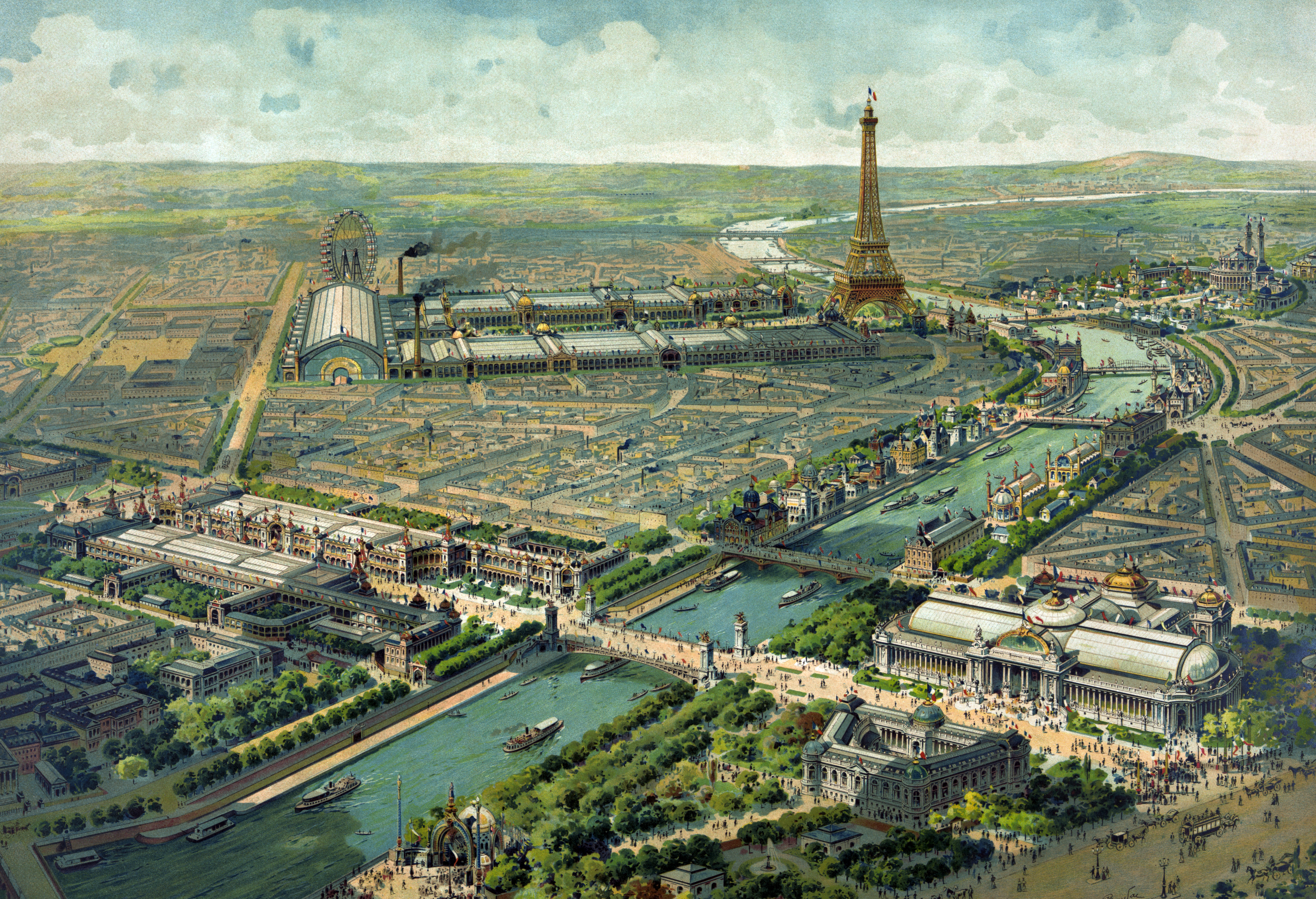
The Exposition Universelle, featured in films 232–233 and 245–261

No.	French title	English title	Date	Status
1	Une partie de cartes	Playing Cards	May 1896	Survives
Méliès's first film, filmed in his garden in Montreuil, Seine-Saint-Denis. See the main article for more information.
3	Plus fort que le maître (leçon de bicyclette)	Smarter Than the Teacher (1st bicycle lesson)	1896	Lost
No further information available.
4	Jardinier brûlant des herbes	Gardener Burning Weeds	1896	Lost
Presumably shows a gardener.
5	Les Chevaux de bois	A Merry-go-Round	1896	Lost
Presumably shows a merry-go-round.
7	Les Blanchisseuses	The Washerwomen	1896	Lost
Presumably shows women cleaning clothes. Washerwomen were a popular subject in art.
8	Arrivée d'un train (gare de Vincennes)	Arrival of a Train at Vincennes Station	1896	Lost
Probably inspired by the Lumière Brothers' film L'Arrivée d'un train en gare de La Ciotat.
10	Place de l'Opéra (1^{er} aspect)	Place de l'Opéra, 1st view (Paris)	1896	Lost
Presumably shows the Place de l'Opéra in Paris. See also films 17 and 139.
11	Place du Théâtre-Français	Place du Théâtre-Français (Paris)	1896	Lost
Presumably shows the Place du Théâtre-Français (present-day Place André-Malraux, home of the Comédie-Française) in Paris.
13	Couronnement de la rosière	Coronation of a Village Maiden (French customs)	1896	Lost
No further information available.
14	Bébé et Fillettes	Baby and Young Girls	1896	Lost
Méliès closed his Théâtre Robert-Houdin once a year for summer vacation; in 1896, the closing was from 14 July to 31 July, and the Méliès family took their vacation on the coast of Normandy. This film, one of those made on the Normandy coast, featured Méliès's daughter Georgette. Méliès made at least fifteen other films on the trip: 27, 28, 29, 30, 31, 32, 33, 34, 40, 41, 43, 47, 49, 59, and 63.
16	Bateaux-Mouches sur la Seine	Steamboats on River Seine	1896	Lost
Filmed in Paris. Presumably shows the River Seine.
17	Place de l'Opéra (2^{e} aspect)	Place de l'Opéra, 2d view (Paris)	1896	Lost
Presumably shows the Place de l'Opéra in Paris. See also films 10 and 139.
18	Boulevard des Italiens	Boulevard des Italiens (Paris)	1896	Lost
Presumably shows the Boulevard des Italiens in Paris.
19	Un lycée de jeunes filles	Academy for Young Ladies	1896	Lost
Probably filmed in Paris.
20	Bois de Boulogne (Touring Club)	Bois de Boulogne (Touring Club, Paris)	1896	Lost
Presumably filmed in the Bois de Boulogne.
21	Bois de Boulogne (Porte de Madrid)	Bois de Boulogne (Porte de Madrid, Paris)	1896	Lost
Presumably filmed in the Bois de Boulogne.
24	Le Régiment	French Regiment Going to the Parade	1896	Lost
No further information available.
25	Campement de bohémiens	Gipsies at Home	1896	Lost
No further information available.
27	Déchargement de bateaux (Le Havre)	Unloading the Boat (Havre)	July 1896	Lost
Presumably filmed in Le Havre during Méliès's summer vacation. For more information, see film 14.
28	Plage de Villers par gros temps	The Beach at Villers in a Gale (France)	July 1896	Lost
Presumably filmed in Villers. For more information, see film 14.
29	Les Quais à Marseille	The Docks at Marseilles (France)	July 1896	Lost
Advertised as if filmed in Marseille, but almost certainly filmed on the coast of Normandy. For more information, see film 14.
30	Jetée et plage de Trouville (1^{re} partie)	Beach and Pier at Trouville (France)	July 1896	Lost
Probably inspired by an 1895 Lumière Brothers film featuring a boat in the harbor of La Ciotat. Presumably filmed in Trouville-sur-Mer. For more information, see film 14.
31	Barque sortant du port de Trouville	Boat Leaving the Harbor of Trouville	July 1896	Lost
Presumably filmed in Trouville-sur-Mer. For more information, see film 14.
32	Jetée et plage de Trouville (2^{e} partie)	Beach and Pier at Trouville (2d part)	July 1896	Lost
Presumably filmed in Trouville-sur-Mer. For more information, see film 14.
33	Jour de marché à Trouville	Market Day (Trouville)	July 1896	Lost
Presumably filmed in Trouville-sur-Mer. For more information, see film 14.
34	Panorama du Havre (pris d'un bateau)	Panorama of Havre Taken From a Boat	July 1896	Lost
Presumably shows Le Havre. For more information, see film 14. (Méliès used "panorama" for titles filmed with the camera fixed to a moving platform, such as a boat or train; other examples include films 151, 201, and some of the Paris Exhibition, 1900 series.)
35	Arrivée d'un train (gare de Joinville)	Arrival of a Train (Joinville Station)	1896	Survives
Survives in flipbook form. Presumably filmed in Joinville-le-Pont. See the main article for more information.
38	Les Forgerons (vue d'atelier)	Blacksmith in His Workshop	1896	Lost
Probably inspired by a Lumière Brothers film with the same title and subject. No further information available.
40	Baignade en mer	Sea Bathing	July 1896	Lost
No further information available. For more information, see film 14.
41	Enfants jouant sur la plage	Children Playing on the Beach	July 1896	Lost
No further information available. For more information, see film 14.
43	Effet de mer sur les rochers	Sea Breaking on the Rocks	July 1896	Lost
Also known as Effets de mer sur les rochers. For more information, see film 14.
46	Départ des automobiles	Automobiles Starting on a Race	1896	Lost
No further information available.
47	Revue navale à Cherbourg	A Naval Review at Cherbourg	July 1896	Lost
Presumably filmed in Cherbourg. For more information, see film 14. Since a naval review was held in Cherbourg on 5 October 1896 to celebrate the visit of Nicholas II of Russia (see film 48), it is possible the film was made then; however, since Méliès appears to have been making actualities in Paris at that time, and only appears to have possessed one camera, it is more likely that the film dates back to his summer vacation in July.
48	Cortège du Tzar allant à Versailles	The Czar and His Cortège Going to Versailles	October 1896	Lost
Nicholas II of Russia and Empress Consort Alexandra Feodorovna visited France from 5 October to 9 October 1894 or 95, debarking in Cherbourg and traveling to Paris, where Méliès was making actualities. The two films he made of the visit, 48 and 50, were first shown on 12 October 1896 in the Théâtre Robert-Houdin. This film presumably shows the imperial couple and their retinue on their way to Versailles.
49	Les Haleurs de bateaux	Towing a Boat on the River	July 1896	Lost
Probably filmed on the coast of Normandy. For more information, see film 14.
50	Cortège du Tzar au Bois de Boulogne	The Czar's Cortège in the Bois de Boulogne	October 1896	Lost
Presumably shows Nicholas II of Russia and his retinue in the Bois de Boulogne. For more information, see film 48.
51	Sortie des ateliers Vibert	Closing Hours at Vibert's Perfume Factory (Paris)	1896	Lost
Probably inspired by the 1895 Lumière Brothers film Workers Leaving the Lumière Factory. No further information available.
52	La Voiture du potier	The Potter's Cart	1896	Lost
Probably filmed in Paris.
54	Place de la Concorde	Place de la Concorde (Paris)	1896	Lost
Presumably shows the Place de la Concorde.
55	La Gare Saint-Lazare	St. Lazare Railroad Station (Paris)	1896	Lost
Presumably shows the Gare Saint-Lazare.
56	Grandes Manœuvres	Manoeuvres of the French Army	1896	Lost
One of a series of military scenes (films 56, 60, 62, 64, 66, 67, and 68). Presumably shows members of the French Army.
58	Place de la Bastille	Place de la Bastille (Paris)	1896	Lost
Presumably shows the Place de la Bastille in Paris.
59	Marée montante sur brise-lames	Tide Rising Over the Breakwater	July 1896	Lost
No further information available. For more information, see film 14.
60	Retour au cantonnement	Return to the Barracks	1896	Lost
Part of the military series (see film 56). No further information available.
62	Réunion d'officiers	French Officers' Meeting	1896	Lost
Part of the military series (see film 56). Presumably shows officers of the French Army.
63	Tempête sur la jetée du Tréport	The Pier at Tréport During a Storm (France)	July 1896	Lost
Presumably filmed in Le Tréport. For more information, see film 14.
64	Le Bivouac	The Bivouac	1896	Lost
Part of the military series (see film 56). Presumably shows the use of a bivouac sack.
65	Batteuse à vapeur	Threshing-Machine Worked by Power	1896	Lost
Presumably shows one or more steam-powered threshing machines. Also known as Threshing Machines Worked by Power.
66	Sac au dos!	Sacks Up!	1896	Lost
Part of the military series (see film 56). No further information available.
67	Libération des territoriaux	Breaking up of the Territorial Army (France)	1896	Lost
Part of the military series (see film 56). Presumably shows members of the French Army.
68	Départ des officiers	Officers of French Army Leaving Service	1896	Lost
Part of the military series (see film 56). Presumably shows officers of the French Army.
69	Place Saint-Augustin	Place Saint-Augustin (Paris)	1896	Lost
Presumably shows the Place Saint-Augustin.
83–84	Le Cortège du Bœuf gras passant place de la Concorde	The Mardi Gras Procession (Paris, 1897)	2 March 1897	Lost
Presumably shows the Place de la Concorde in Paris on Mardi Gras.
85	Cortège du Bœuf gras, boulevard des Italiens	The Mardi Gras Procession (Paris, 1898) [sic]	2 March 1897	Lost
Presumably shows the Boulevard des Italiens in Paris on Mardi Gras. Note that the English-language catalogue entry for the film erroneously dated it to the following year, 1898.
86	Une cour de ferme	A Farm Yard	1897	Lost
Presumably shows a farmyard.
87	Les Apprentis militaires	Military Apprentices	1897	Lost
No further information available.
91	Défilé des pompiers	Firemen on Parade	1897	Lost
Presumably shows members of a fire department.
92	Danseuses au Jardin de Paris	Dancing Girls (Jardin de Paris)	1897	Lost
No further information available.
97–98	Cortège de la Mi-Carême	Mid-Lent Procession in Paris	25 March 1897	Lost
Filmed in Paris on Laetare Sunday (in French, Mi-Carême).
99	Bataille de confettis	Battle With Confetti	25 March 1897	Lost
Filmed in Paris on Laetare Sunday (in French, Mi-Carême).
115	Tourneur en poterie	A Potterymaker	1897	Lost
Presumably shows an artisan using a potter's wheel.
136	Match de boxe (professeurs de l'École de Joinville)	Boxing Match	1897	Lost
Presumably filmed at the military school in Joinville-le-Pont.
139	Carrefour de l'Opéra	Place de l'Opéra, 3d view (Paris)	1897–1898	Lost
Claimed to be the first film to use time-lapse photography. Presumably shows the Place de l'Opéra in Paris. See also films 10 and 17.
148	Assaut d'escrime (École de Joinville)	Fencing at the Joinville School	1898	Lost
Presumably filmed at the military school in Joinville-le-Pont.
151	Panorama pris d'un train en marche (ponts et tunnels)	Panorama from Top of Moving Train	1898	Survives
Filmed on a train on the Chemin de fer de Petite Ceinture, passing the station Bel-Air-Ceinture. Also known as Panorama from Top of a Moving Train.
157	Montagnes russes nautiques	Shooting the Chutes	1898	Lost
Presumably shows a roller coaster (in French, montagnes russes).
173–174	Funérailles de Félix Faure (1—char; 2—les troupes)	Funeral of Felix Faure	23 February 1899	Lost
Filmed in Paris. Presumably shows the hearse and attending troops at the funeral of Félix Faure, President of France.
193	Combat de coqs	A Lively Cock-Fight (US), A Lively Cock Fight (UK)	1899	Lost
Presumably shows a cockfight.
201	Panorama du port de Saint-Hélier (île de Jersey)	Bird's-Eye View of St. Helier (Jersey)	1899	Lost
In 1899 the Méliès family again took their summer vacation on the coast of Normandy. During the trip Méliès filmed three actualities (201, 202, and 203), as well as footage of the open sea, which he used in special effects in his fiction films Neptune and Amphitrite and Christ Walking on the Water the same year. This film presumably shows the port of Saint Helier.
202	Entrée du paquebot Victoria dans le port de Jersey	Steamer Entering the Harbor of Jersey	1899	Lost
Presumably filmed in Jersey. For more information, see film 201.
203	Débarquement des voyageurs, port de Granville	Passengers Landing at Harbor of Granville	1899	Lost
Presumably filmed in Granville, Manche. For more information, see film 201.
232–233	Panorama de la Seine	Panorama of River Seine	1899	Lost
Two short actualities filmed on the Seine, showing construction of buildings for the 1900 Exposition Universelle in Paris. See Paris Exposition, 1900 (film series): Related films for more information.
245–261	Vues spéciales de l'Exposition de 1900	Paris Exhibition, 1900	1900	Unknown
A series of seventeen actualities, serving as a documentary record of the 1900 Exposition Universelle in Paris. See the main article for more information.

== Notes ==
=== Citations ===
- Ezra, Elizabeth (2000), Georges Méliès, Manchester: Manchester University Press, ISBN 0719053951
- Essai de reconstitution du catalogue français de la Star-Film; suivi d'une analyse catalographique des films de Georges Méliès recensés en France, Bois d'Arcy: Service des archives du film du Centre national de la cinématographie, 1981, ISBN 2903053073, OCLC 10506429
- Frazer, John (1979), Artificially Arranged Scenes: The Films of Georges Méliès, Boston: G. K. Hall & Co., ISBN 0816183686
- Malthête, Jacques; Mannoni, Laurent (2008), L'oeuvre de Georges Méliès, Paris: Éditions de La Martinière, ISBN 9782732437323
- Rosen, Miriam (1987), "Méliès, Georges", in Wakeman, John (ed.), World Film Directors: Volume I, 1890–1945, New York: The H. W. Wilson Company, pp. 747–765, ISBN 0824207572
