= The Mischances of a Photographer =

1908 French film

- Directed by: Georges Méliès
- Production company: Star Film Company
- Release date: 1908
- Country: France
- Language: Silent

The Mischances of a Photographer is a 1908 French silent trick film by Georges Méliès. In the United States, it was sold by Méliès's Star Film Company and is numbered 1250–1252 in its catalogues. No French release is known to have occurred at the time.

The first scene notably includes, as part of the set decor, a bust of Jean-Eugène Robert-Houdin, Méliès's predecessor for whom his Théâtre Robert-Houdin was named. Many of the film's props were recycled from earlier Méliès films or would be recycled later: the wardrobe had been used in Rogues' Tricks (1907) and the photographic apparatus in A Mix-up in the Gallery (1906), while the fireplace and candlesticks reappear in The Diabolic Tenant (1909).

The lead is unidentified, but appears to be the same actor as the lead in Méliès's The Dream of an Opium Fiend, made the same year. The second scene is filmed outdoors, in front of the larger of Méliès's two studio buildings (Studio B); its glass wall can be seen in the background.
