= Sideshow Wrestlers =

1908 film by Georges Méliès

- Directed by: Georges Méliès
- Production company: Star Film Company
- Release date: 1908
- Country: France
- Language: Silent

Sideshow Wrestlers (French: Le Conseil du pipelet ou Un tour à la foire, literally "The Janitor's Advice, or A Visit to the Fair") is a 1908 French short silent film by Georges Méliès. It was sold by Méliès's Star Film Company and is numbered 1159–1165 in its catalogues, where it was advertised as a bouffonnerie extravagante (an "extravagant buffoonery").

== Plot ==
On the encouragement of his friend, a lodging-house janitor, a man goes to try his luck sparring a professional wrestler at a fair sideshow. He watches some of them at work, including a exaggeratedly sturdy woman wrestler who completely flattens her opponent. Finally he is pitted against an extremely tall wrestler, and manages to come out victorious.

== Production ==
The French title, Le Conseil du pipelet, refers to the lodging-house janitor in the first scene; such janitors had been called "pipelets" in France since the publication of Eugène Sue's The Mysteries of Paris (1842–43), where the name first appears. The film finds Méliès reusing a bit of physical comedy, with a man flattened out like a pancake by means of a careful substitution splice, that he had already used in Fat and Lean Wrestling Match (1900) and An Adventurous Automobile Trip (1905). In turn, he would reuse the janitor's uniform in The Diabolic Tenant (1909).

The film has been known to survive since at least the 1970s, when John Frazer's book Artificially Arranged Scenes described its action but misreported the French title as High-Life Taylor (the French title of a lost Méliès film, Up-to-Date Clothes Cleaning). The confusion around the films' bilingual titles was cleared up in a Centre national de la cinématographie publication a few years later.
