= Coppelia, the Animated Doll =

1900 film by Georges Méliès

- Directed by: Georges Méliès
- Based on: Coppélia by Arthur Saint-Léon and Léo Delibes
- Production company: Star Film Company
- Release date: 1900
- Country: France
- Language: Silent

Coppelia, the Animated Doll (French: Coppelia ou la Poupée animée) is a 1900 French short silent film by Georges Méliès. It was sold by Méliès's Star Film Company and is numbered 307–308 in its catalogues.

The film is modeled on the 1870 ballet Coppélia, which itself is loosely based on E. T. A. Hoffmann's story "The Sandman". The ballet —probably acting alongside the version of the same story in Jacques Offenbach's The Tales of Hoffmann— inspired Méliès on numerous occasions, including a stage illusion at his Théâtre Robert-Houdin as well as various others of his films, such as An Up-to-Date Conjuror (1899) and Extraordinary Illusions (1903).

Coppelia, the Animated Doll is currently presumed lost.
