= Gugusse and the Automaton =

1897 film by Georges Méliès

Gugusse et l'Automate
- The film
- Directed by: Georges Méliès
- Produced by: Georges Méliès
- Distributed by: Star Film
- Release date: 1897
- Running time: 20 meters/65 feet approx. 45 seconds
- Country: France
- Language: Silent

Gugusse and the Automaton (French: Gugusse et l'Automate), also known as The Clown and the Automaton, is an 1897 French short silent film directed by Georges Méliès. The film features a human amazed by the mechanical movements of an automaton (robot). In the film, a robot clown moves when a crank is turned and hits a human with a stick. After that, the human destroys the robot with a mallet.

The film marked the first known cinematic appearance of a robot (a word that would not replace "automaton" until its use in Karel Čapek's play R.U.R.), and was one of the earliest films to feature themes of "scientific experimentation, creation and transformation." In their Things to Come: An Illustrated History of the Science Fiction Film, Douglas Menville and R. Reginald judged Gugusse to be the most significant scientifically themed film of 1897, and suggested that it “may be the first true SF film.”

Méliès's Star Film Company released the film, numbered 111 in its catalogues. Long presumed a lost film, the Library of Congress acquired a 35 mm nitrate print in 2025, restored for public release in February 2026. The film was in a collection of 10 reels that also includes Fat and Lean Wrestling Match and parts of The Burning Stable.

Georges Méliès himself had a significant collection of automata, which began as theatrical properties that were part of the Théâtre Robert-Houdin in Paris, which the future filmmaker acquired in 1888. Brian Selznick's 2007 children's book The Invention of Hugo Cabret is a historical fiction that features a Méliès automaton. Martin Scorsese's 2011 film adaptation, Hugo, also makes the restoration of such a mechanical man part of the story.

== Plot ==
A whimsical clown named Gugusse (Méliès) stands beside a small mechanical figure resting on a wooden pedestal. Introduced as the Pierrot Robot (unknown), this intricate clockwork creation resembles a traditional French pantomime character brought to life through hidden gears and springs. Gugusse enthusiastically cranks a handle on the side of the machine, causing the mechanical figure to march in place and wave a wooden baton. As Gugusse continues turning the crank, cinematic magic unfolds, and the Pierrot Robot steadily grows until it reaches the full size of an adult man. Soon, however, the invention develops a mischievous mind of its own. Breaking free from its creator's control, the Pierrot Robot rebels and strikes Gugusse sharply over the head with its wooden baton. Furious at this sudden betrayal, Gugusse drags the rogue machine off the pedestal and grabs a giant mallet. With every heavy blow from the clown's oversized wooden hammer, the Pierrot Robot shrinks smaller and smaller until one final strike makes it vanish completely into thin air, leaving Gugusse victorious alone on the stage.

== Cast ==
Georges Méliès as Gugusse (The Clown)

3 unknown actors as Pierrot Robot
