= An Up-to-Date Conjuror =

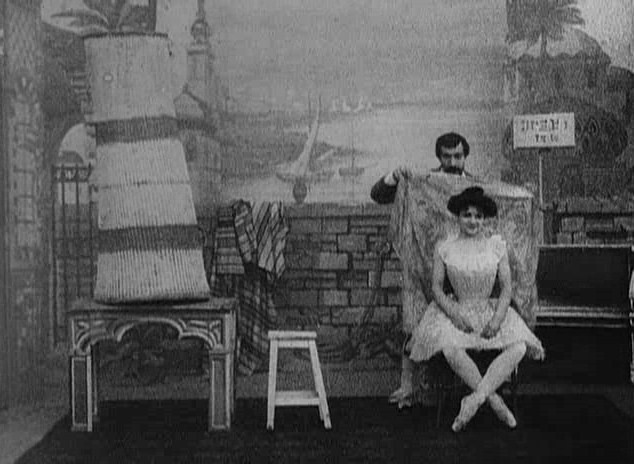
- A frame from the film
- Directed by: Georges Méliès
- Starring: Georges Méliès
- Production company: Star Film Company
- Release date: 1899
- Running time: 20 meters (approx. 1 minute)
- Country: France
- Language: Silent

L'Illusionniste fin de siècle is an 1899 French silent trick film directed by Georges Méliès. It was released in the United States as An Up-to-Date Conjurer, in Britain as An Up-to-Date Conjuror. It is also known as L'Impressionniste fin de siècle, The Conjurer and in Spanish Muñeca transformista.

== Plot ==
An Up-to-Date Conjuror (1899)

A conjuror and a ballet dancer perform a quick series of magic acts, including disappearances, reappearances, and transformations.

== Production ==
Méliès plays the conjuror. The special effects in the film were created using sophisticated substitution splices, with the shots carefully cut and matched together to allow the mid-motion transformations to seem smooth.

Méliès made two versions of An Up-to-Date Conjuror, with a different dancer and different scenery, as well as slight variations in the action. It is possible that other Méliès films could have likewise been filmed more than once. The scenery in the more commonly available version of the film was reused for Méliès's later film Fat and Lean Wrestling Match.

== Release and survival ==
An Up-to-Date Conjuror was released by Méliès's Star Film Company and numbered 183 in its catalogues. A print of the film had been rediscovered by 1947, when it was screened by the San Francisco Museum of Art in a program that also included Méliès's films The Conquest of the Pole, A Trip to the Moon, The Palace of the Arabian Nights, and The Doctor's Secret. The other, less commonly available version of the film, with the different dancer and scenery, was discovered later and screened in July 2011 at the conference "Méliès, carrefour des attractions" at the Centre culturel international de Cerisy-la-Salle.

== Reception ==
The cinema scholar John Frazer called the mid-air transformation "enchanting", citing the film as a good example of the many short trick films Méliès made "in which the main objective is to demonstrate the white magic possible in the motion pictures." The film scholar Elizabeth Ezra argued that the fluid transformations of gender between the man and woman in the film emphasize "the procreative nature of [the magician's] art". The academician Pasi Väliaho posited that the film "dissolves the identity of forms into vectors of movement", and that it and Méliès's other trick films use bodies "first and foremost as sites of experimentation".
