= Arrival of a Train (Joinville Station) =

- Directed by: Georges Méliès
- Distributed by: Star Film
- Release date: 1896
- Running time: 20 meters/65 feet
- Country: France
- Language: Silent

Arrival of a Train (Joinville Station) (French: Arrivée d'un train (gare de Joinville)) is an 1896 French silent actuality film directed by Georges Méliès. It was released by Méliès's company Star Film and is numbered 35 in its catalogues.

== Background ==
At the beginning of his filmmaking career, the French illusionist Georges Méliès made a long series of short actuality films. These films, modeled after similar actuality films by the pioneering Lumière Brothers, were brief "slice of life" incidents, made by preparing naturalistic scenes for the camera or by filming events of the day. All told, Méliès filmed 93 films, or 18% of his entire output, outdoors as actuality footage. Arrival of a Train (Joinville Station), one such actuality, was filmed by Méliès in late July, 1896.

== Synopsis ==
From the vantage point of the platform, a train pulls into Joinville-le-Pont station. Attended by railway workers, various passengers leave as new ones arrive.

== Rediscovery ==
Reconstruction of the Beaulieu flipbook

In 2013, South American animator Bernhard Richter and his daughter Sara Richter drew attention to a flipbook published around 1900 by Léon Beaulieu, showing a train arriving at a station. Beaulieu was a manufacturer of flipbooks, or "folioscopes," based on movies produced between 1895 and 1898. Bernhard Richter happened across the flipbook in a German bookshop in 2013, while looking for ephemera related to filmmaking. From their initial research, the Richters suggested that the flipbook might be the only surviving print of one of Georges Méliès's earliest films, Arrival of a Train at Vincennes Station, currently presumed lost.

The Richters' initial identification was based on the type of train depicted in the flipbook, but Sara Richter noted in a statement to the magazine Variety that they had not found conclusive evidence to link the flipbook to Méliès. The UCLA archivist Jan-Christopher Horak noted that, without further identification, the flipbook might show a film by either Méliès or the Lumière Brothers. The preservationist Serge Bromberg similarly commented on the need for further evidence.

Georges Méliès's great-great-granddaughter Pauline Méliès noted in an online statement that the flipbook may derive from Méliès, but, based on scrutiny of the inscriptions on the train, nominated a slightly later Méliès film, Arrival of a Train (Joinville Station). In 2020 a French film scholar, Thierry Lecointe, confirmed that the flipbook was of the Joinville film. He cited evidence including shadow placement, platform furniture shown on antique postcards, and first-hand visits to the stations themselves, as well as a more complete copy of the flipbook found by Richter.
