= The Enchanted Sedan Chair =

1905 film by Georges Méliès

- Directed by: Georges Méliès
- Based on: "La Cage d'Or" by Georges Méliès
- Starring: Georges Méliès
- Production company: Star Film Company
- Release date: 1905
- Country: France
- Language: Silent

The Enchanted Sedan Chair (French: La Chaise à porteurs enchantée) is a 1905 French silent trick film by Georges Méliès. It was sold by Méliès's Star Film Company and is numbered 738–739 in its catalogues.

== Plot ==
Before a backdrop of a rugged landscape, a magician conjures up various outfits from an empty glass box, and, with the aid of an assistant transforms them into a couple in 18th-century dress. Summoning two flunkeys carrying a sedan chair, the magician performs an illusion in which the couple, under cover of a shawl and the chair itself, switch places. Leading on his assistant, he sets up what appears to be a three-person variation of the same trick. However, all three of the assistants suddenly transform into the magician and the flunkeys. The magician makes the original three assistants appear and disappear, along with the sedan chair itself, before the whole company dance on once more for a curtain call.

== Production ==
Méliès plays the magician in the film, which is probably based on "La Cage d'Or", an 1897 illusion he had created for his stage magic venue, the Théâtre Robert-Houdin.

The film's special effects include substitution splices and dissolves. Like most of Méliès's films, The Enchanted Sedan Chair was filmed in a glass-roofed studio in Montreuil-sous-Bois. The glass roof can be glimpsed near the beginning of the film, reflected in the lid of the glass cage.
