= Extraordinary Illusions =

- Directed by: Georges Méliès
- Starring: Georges Méliès
- Production company: Star Film Company
- Release date: 1903
- Country: France
- Language: Silent

Illusions funambulesques, sold in the United States as Extraordinary Illusions and in Britain as The 20th Century Illustrationist, is a 1903 French silent trick film by Georges Méliès. It was sold by Méliès's Star Film Company and is numbered 512–513 in its catalogues.

Méliès plays the magician in the film, which uses substitution splices and dissolves to create its tricks. Méliès returned to the motif of dressing up and transforming a mannequin in a 1905 film, The Enchanted Sedan Chair.

Illusions funambulesques should not be confused with an earlier Méliès film, Dislocation Extraordinary (1901). This earlier film has also been known in English as Extraordinary Illusions since at least 1979, when John Frazer described it under that title. A 2008 home video Méliès collection used the title Extraordinary Illusions for both the 1901 and the 1903 films.
