= Moitié de polka =

- Directed by: Georges Méliès
- Production company: Star Film Company
- Release date: 1908
- Country: France
- Language: Silent

Moitié de polka (literally "Half polka") was a 1908 French short silent film by Georges Méliès. It was sold by Méliès's Star Film Company and is numbered 1386–1393 in its catalogues.

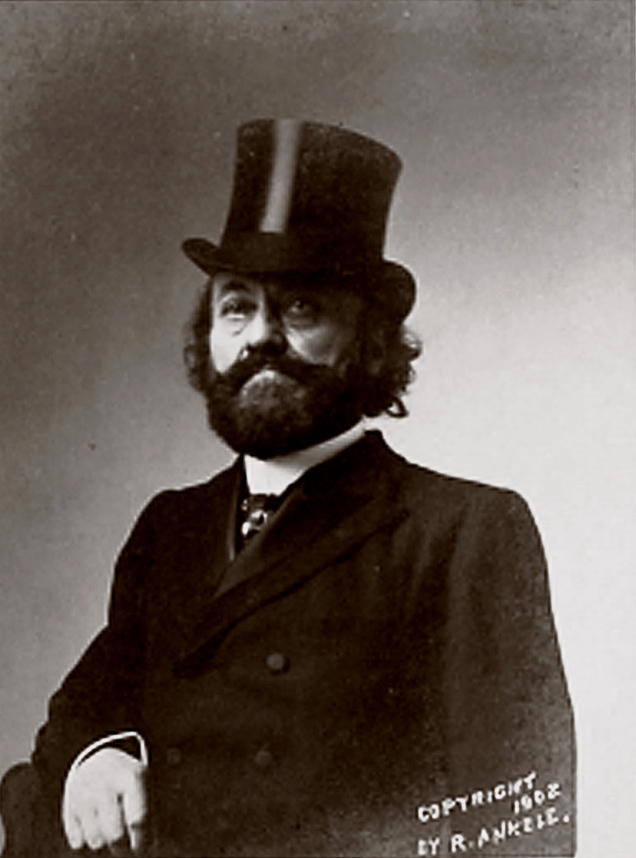
Buatier de Kolta in 1902

Though the plot of the film is unknown, it may have been built around a parody of the famous illusionist Buatier de Kolta (born Joseph Buatier, 1845–1903). In the first decade of Méliès's directorship of the Théâtre Robert-Houdin, a Paris venue for stage illusionists, Buatier was considered one of the world’s major magicians. His style was minimalist, in modern dress without scenery; Méliès adapted some of Buatier's illusions into his own very different style for some of his trick films, with The Vanishing Lady and The Brahmin and the Butterfly the most frequently cited examples.

In the 1899 edition of Passez Muscade, an annual revue at the Théâtre, Méliès parodied his famous rival's act, caricaturing him as a pompous magician with the similar-sounding name "Moitié de Polka". (The revue even included a spoof of a specific Buatier illusion, "Le Miracle".) The film, reusing the name of Méliès's stage parody, may have featured a similar caricature of the illusionist.

Moitié de polka is currently presumed lost.
