= Satan in Prison =

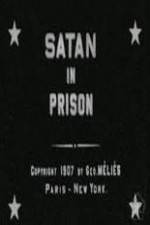
- Directed by: Georges Méliès
- Starring: Georges Méliès
- Production company: Star Film Company
- Release date: 1907
- Running time: Approx. 5 minutes
- Country: France
- Language: Silent

Satan in Prison (French: Satan en prison) is a 1907 French silent trick film by Georges Méliès. The film tells the story of an imprisoned man (played by Méliès himself) who turns out to be the Devil in disguise.

== Plot ==
The film features Méliès in a room which is intended to be a cell and he finds ways to cure his boredom by performing tricks, such as vanishing and magically appearing picture frames and sudden appearing fireplaces and dinner tables with wine. Towards the end of the film he appears as Satan and tricks his guards by disappearing in a blanket.

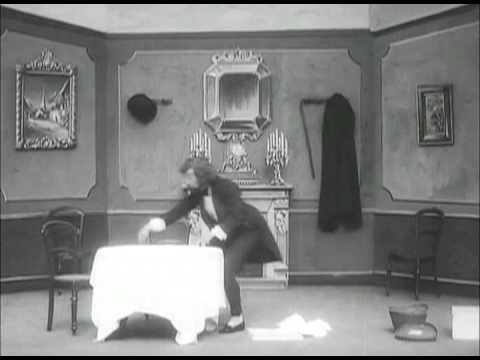

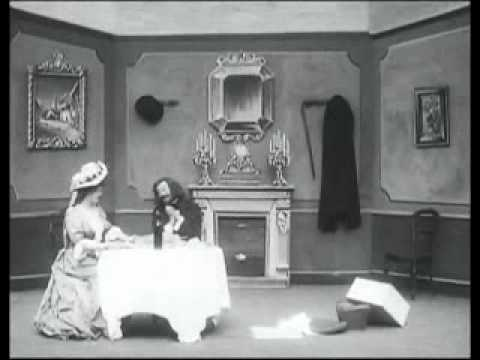

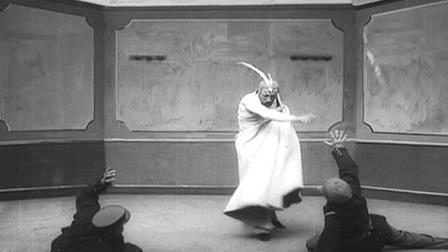

== Production and release ==
Méliès, who had begun his performing career as a successful stage magician, often featured the Devil in his films, taking advantage of the character's possibilities as a creator of strange magical happenings. In Satan in Prison, as was his usual practice, Méliès himself appears as the Devil.

The film's special effects were created with pyrotechnics and substitution splices. Méliès filmed an expanded version of the same idea, with many of the same props but with more characters and a more elaborate narrative, two years later as The Diabolic Tenant. Satan in Prison was sold by Méliès's Star Film Company and numbered 1010–1013 in its catalogues.
