= The Doctor's Secret (1909 film) =

1910 film by Georges Méliès

- Directed by: Georges Méliès
- Starring: Georges Méliès
- Production company: Star Film Company
- Release date: 1909
- Country: France
- Language: Silent

The Doctor's Secret (French: Hydrothérapie fantastique) is a 1909 French silent trick film by Georges Méliès. It was sold by Méliès's Star Film Company and is numbered 1476–1485 in its catalogues.

Méliès appears in the film as the hydrotherapist. Photographic evidence suggests that the film was a new version of an unidentified Méliès film from around 1900, for which two stills survive at the Cinémathèque Française. The bathtub prop was reused from Méliès's 1907 film Rogues' Tricks; special effects in the film were worked with substitution splices, stage machinery, and pyrotechnics.
