= Paris Exposition, 1900 (film series) =

- Directed by: Georges Méliès
- Produced by: Georges Méliès
- Production company: Star Film Company
- Release date: 1900
- Running time: 17 films, 20 meters each Approx. 17 minutes total
- Country: France
- Language: Silent

Paris Exposition, 1900 (French: Vues spéciales de l'Exposition de 1900) is a series of seventeen short French silent actuality films made in 1900 by Georges Méliès. The series was a documentary record of the 1900 Exposition Universelle in Paris.

== Summary ==
=== Main series ===
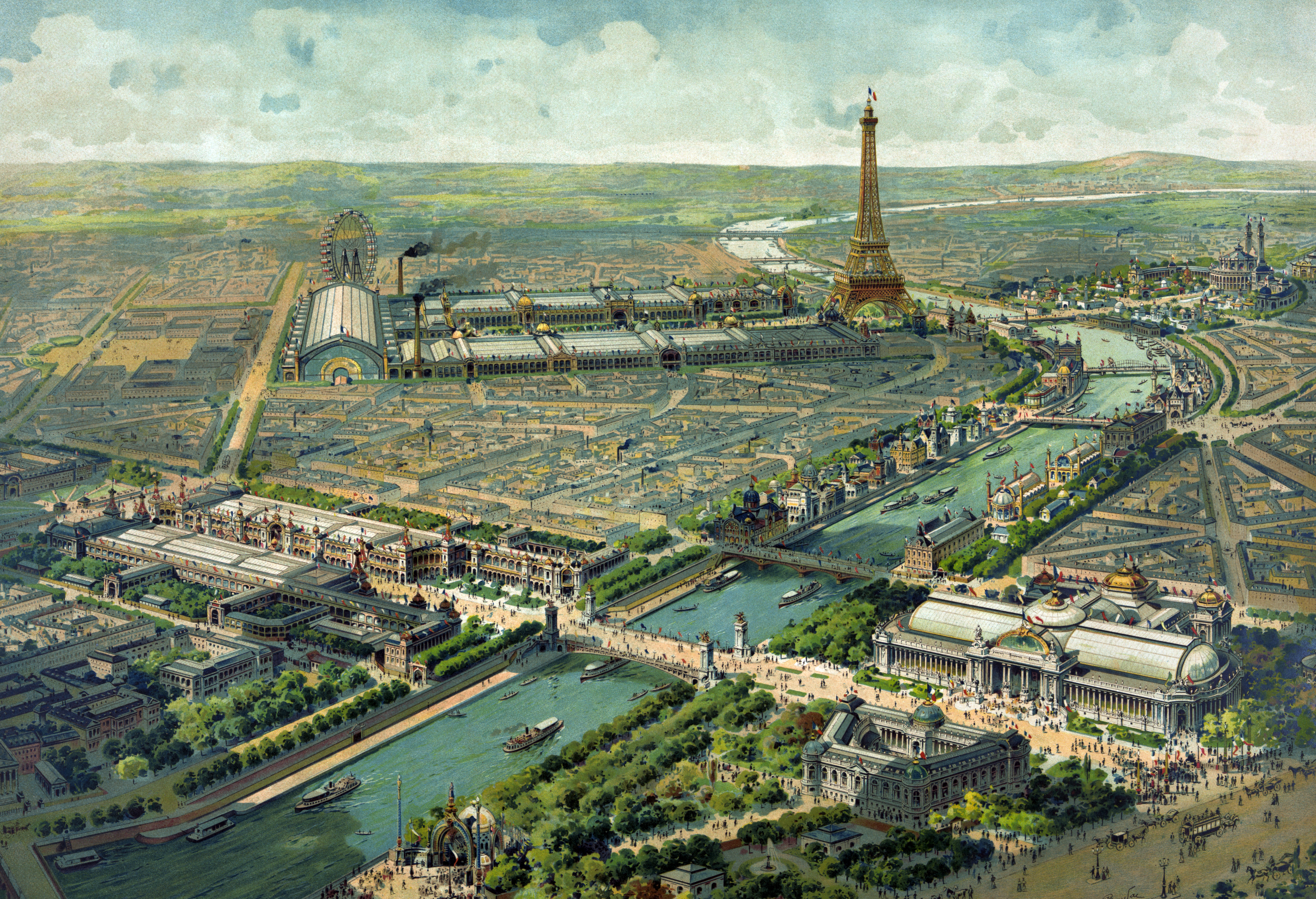
Panoramic view of the Exposition

The following list includes the original French title and the English release title (note that English-language catalogs preceded each title with the series name and a dash, e.g. Paris Exposition, 1900—The Moving Sidewalk), as well the numbers assigned to the films in Méliès's Star Film Company catalogs.

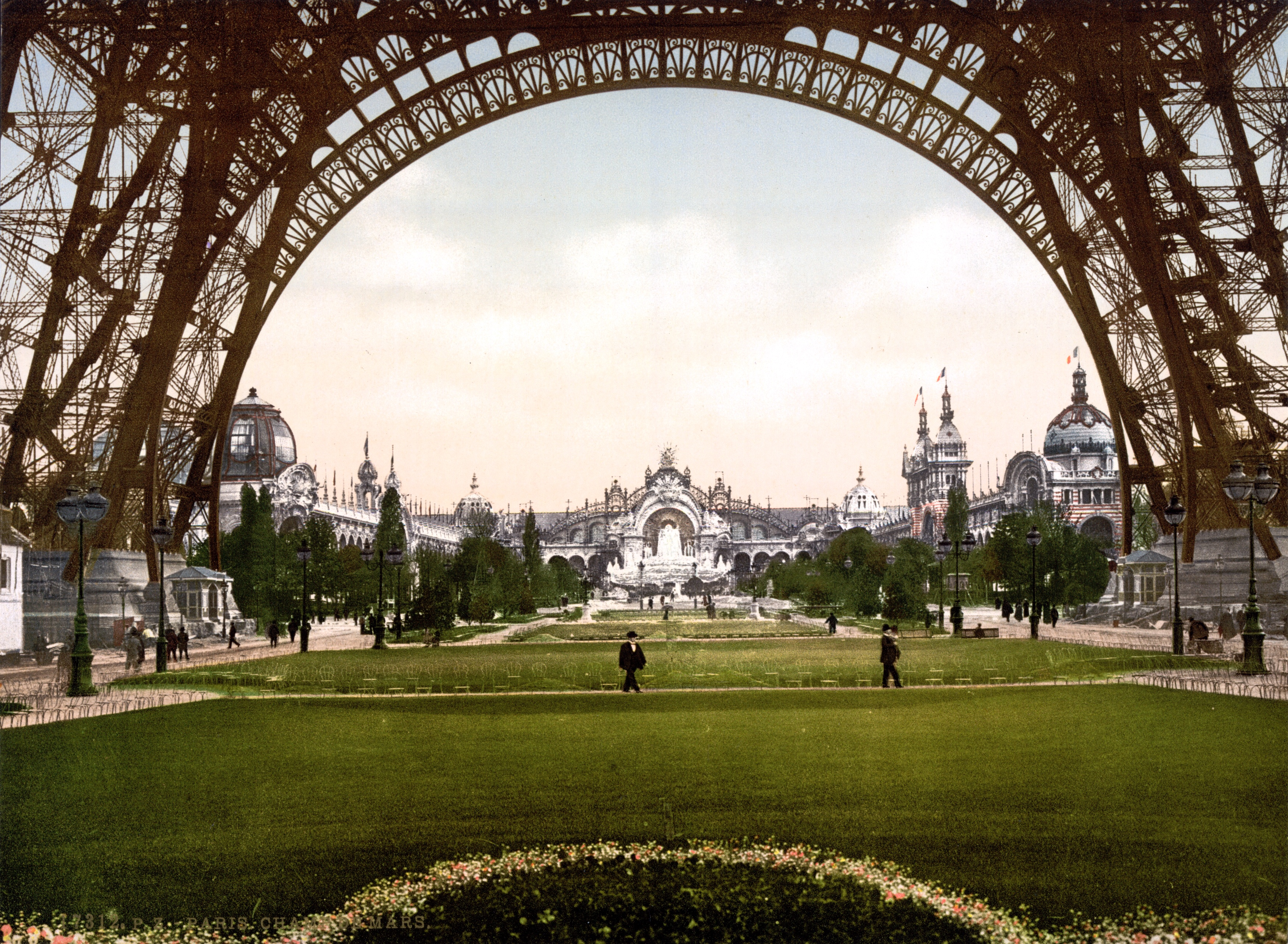
The Champ-de-Mars, with the Eiffel Tower in the foreground

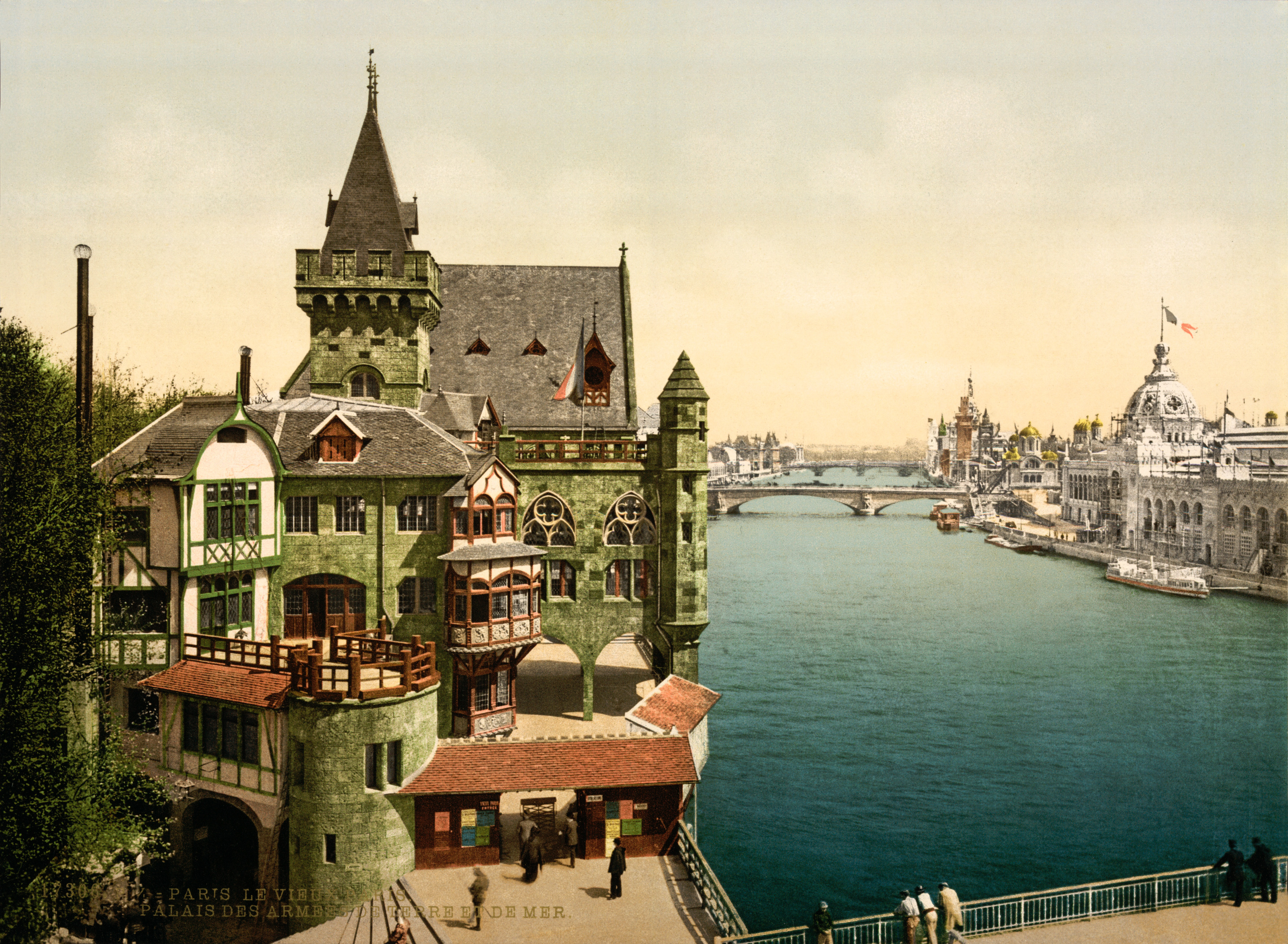
Old Paris and the Army and Navy Pavilions

#	French title	English title
245	La Porte Monumentale	"La Porte Monumentale"
246	Panorama mouvant pris du trottoir roulant (le Champ-de-Mars)	Moving Panorama, 1
247	Panorama mouvant pris du trottoir roulant (l'esplanade des Invalides)	Moving Panorama, 2
248	Panorama mouvant pris du trottoir roulant (la rue des Nations)	Moving Panorama, 3
249	Détail du trottoir roulant	Details Connected With the Moving Sidewalk
250	La Plate-forme roulante	The Moving Sidewalk
251	Vue panoramique prise en bateau sur la Seine (le pavillon des armées de Terre et de Mer)	Panoramic View, taken while boating on the River Seine.—Army and Navy Pavilions
252	Vue panoramique faisant suite à la précédente (les palais étrangers)	Panoramic View, taken while boating on the River Seine.—Foreign palaces
253	Vue panoramique prise en bateau sur la Seine (panorama général du Vieux Paris)	Panoramic View, taken while boating on the River Seine.—Old Paris
254	Porte d'entrée de l'Exposition sur l'avenue des Champs-Élysées	The Avenue of the Champs Elysées.—Palaces of Fine Arts
255	Vue panoramique prise à l'avant du train électrique	Panoramic View from the Electric Railway
256	Panorama circulaire des Champs-Élysées (Palais des Beaux-Arts)	Panoramic Excursion Round the Champs Elysées
257	Panorama circulaire (les Invalides)	Panoramic Circular Tour; "Les Invalides"
258	Panorama circulaire (pris du centre du Champ-de-Mars)	Circular Panorama; Champ de Mars
259	Panorama circulaire (pris du centre du jardin du Trocadéro)	Trocadero
260	Panorama circulaire de la Seine (pont d'Iéna)	Iéna Bridge
261	Panorama semi-circulaire (pris du sommet des tours du Trocadéro)	From the Trocadero

=== Related films ===
In addition to the Paris Exposition, 1900 series proper, Méliès also sold two films, filmed on the River Seine in 1899, showing pre-opening work progressing on Exposition buildings on both sides of the river. These two films were released separately in France but were sold together as a continuous film (numbered 232–233) in English-speaking catalogs. Like the main series, these films were each 20 meters long.

#	French title	English title
232	Panorama de la Seine (les travaux de l'exposition de 1900: le Vieux-Paris, rive droite)	Panorama of River Seine
233	Panorama de la Seine (les travaux de l'exposition de 1900: les palais en construction, rive gauche)	Panorama of River Seine

== Production ==
Méliès traveled at least twice to the Paris Exposition for his shots, filming architectural views early in the exposition year and shots of the ongoing exposition later on. He employed various techniques to achieve his views, shooting variously from stationary vantage points, from the Exposition's moving sidewalk, from the River Seine, and from an electric train. The circular panoramas of the Palais des Beaux Arts, Les Invalides, the Champs de Mars, Trocadéro, and the Pont d'Iéna were made by placing the camera on a specially built Gaumont turning platform.

Edison's version of the panorama from the moving walkway

Though unconnected to Méliès's enterprise, another early filmmaker, the Edison Manufacturing Company producer James Henry White, also filmed scenes from the Exposition in July 1900. White's camera was equipped with a newly designed panning-head tripod, allowing for numerous panoramas from stationary vantage points.

== Status ==
The Méliès scholar John Frazer reported in 1979 that the Paris Exposition, 1900 series survived in a private collection, but a 2008 Méliès filmography prepared by Jacques Malthête labels all seventeen films, as well as the two earlier films showing work in progress, to be presumed lost.
