= Playing Cards (film) =

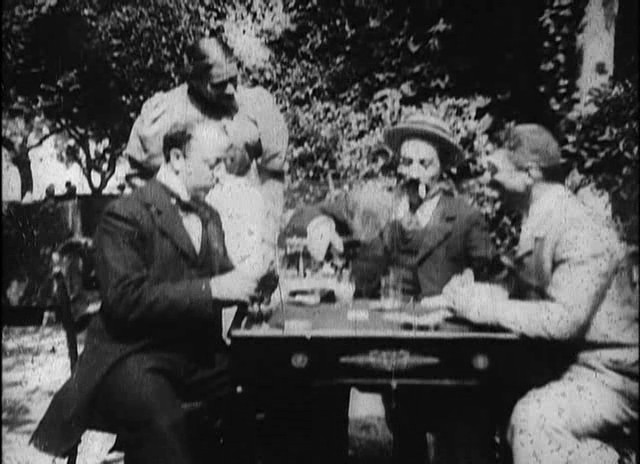
- Directed by: Georges Méliès
- Release date: 1896
- Running time: 67 seconds
- Country: France
- Language: Silent

Playing Cards (French: Une partie de cartes, literally "A Card Party") is an 1896 French black-and-white silent actuality film by Georges Méliès. It was the first film in Méliès' prolific career, and thus is number one in his Star Film catalogue. It is a remake of Louis Lumière's film The Messers. Lumière at Cards, which was released earlier the same year. Along with Georges Méliès himself, his brother Gaston Méliès and daughter Georgette Méliès also appear in the film.

== Synopsis ==
Playing Cards (1896)

It is afternoon in a French garden. Three men are sitting at a table, two of them playing cards while the third smokes and reads a newspaper. The man who is not playing cards calls over a young girl and has her fetch a woman with a bottle of beer. He proceeds to pour glasses for himself and his friends. After drinking the beer, the man reads a story out of the newspaper, and his friends laugh.

== Survival ==
The film, long presumed lost, was rediscovered after 1981, and included on a home video release in 2008.
