= Conjuring (1896 film) =

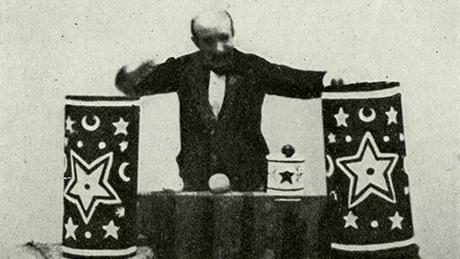
- A still from the film
- Directed by: Georges Méliès
- Production company: Star Film Company
- Release date: 1896 (France)
- Running time: original running time unknown, but the film was 20 metres long. Only 5 seconds remain.
- Country: France
- Language: Silent

Conjuring (French: Séance de prestidigitation) is an 1896 French silent trick film directed by Georges Méliès, who is also the actor doing the "conjuring".

== Production and release ==
The film reproduces a magic act Méliès performed at his Paris theater-of-illusions, the Théâtre Robert-Houdin.

Remaining 5 seconds of the movie

Conjuring is Méliès's second film, and his first to move beyond the actuality film genre pioneered by the Lumière brothers and experiment with using the camera to capture a theatrical magic act. (Later in 1896, with his discovery of the substitution splice technique, Méliès was able to begin augmenting his theatrical illusions with new special effects unique to film.) Conjuring can thus be seen as Méliès's first foray into the world of fiction film.

The film was released by Méliès's Star Film Company and numbered 2 in its catalogues.

== Rediscovery ==
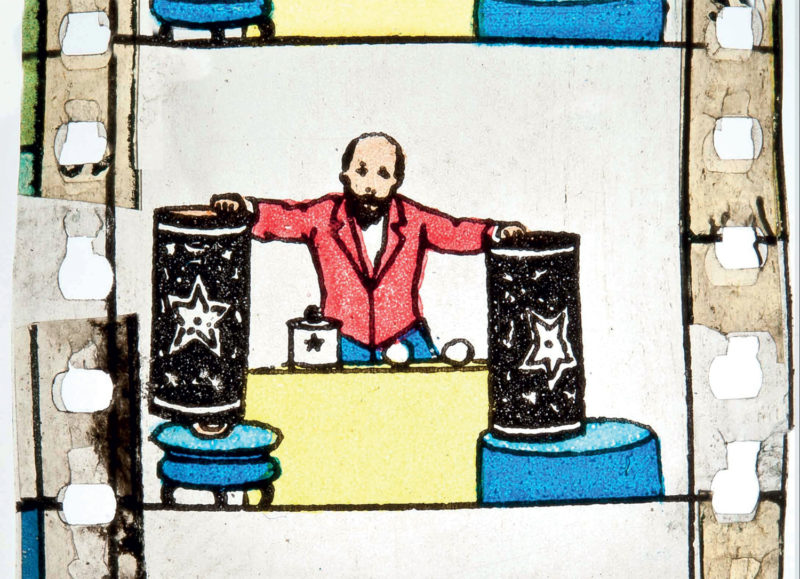
A frame from the rotoscoped version

In 2014, the Cinémathèque française received a donation from the collector François Binétruy: a short fragment of chromolithographed animated film, rotoscoped from an unidentified 1896 Méliès film and showing Méliès himself performing a conjuring trick. Such fragments of animation had been manufactured from 1897 onward in Germany and France, for home use in toy projectors.

In 2015, the Cinémathèque uncovered another fragmentary home-projector version of the same film, this time reproducing the original black-and-white live-action frames. In July 2015, the film scholar Jacques Malthête identified the film as Georges Méliès's Conjuring.
