= The Diabolic Tenant =

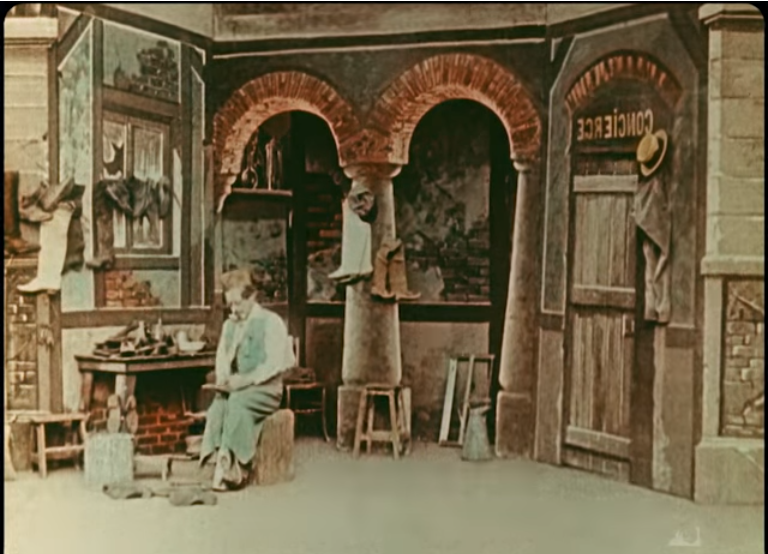
- A frame from the film
- Directed by: Georges Méliès
- Starring: Georges Méliès
- Production company: Star Film Company
- Release date: 1909
- Running time: 7 minutes
- Country: France
- Language: Silent

The Diabolic Tenant (French: Le Locataire diabolique), originally released in English-speaking countries as The Fiendish Tenant, is a 1909 French silent trick film directed by Georges Méliès. It was released by Méliès's Star Film Company and is numbered 1495–1501 in its catalogues.

== Plot ==
Un Locataire diabolique (1909)

A bearded stranger, carrying a single valise, arrives at a seaside boarding house. The janitor in charge shows him to an unfurnished room, still being papered. Once the janitor has left, the new tenant throws the paper hanger out the window, and fills the room with a vast assortment of things magically taken from his valise: a steamer trunk larger than the valise itself, a fireplace, chairs, a piano, various decorations and hangings, a fully set dining table, and even a whole family and a housemaid. The janitor, bringing in a small tray of food, is astonished to see the tenant and family enjoying a grand dinner in the magically furnished room. He runs away in flight.

Later, the tenant is reading a newspaper by the fireplace, when the janitor comes in to present the tenant with his bill. The tenant, indicating that he has no money, rejects the bill and leaves the janitor alone in the room, where all the furniture comes alive. The panicked janitor rushes back to his office and alerts his female partner.

Back in the room, the tenant quickly packs most of the furniture into the steamer trunk, which itself disappears into the valise. A policeman runs in to stop the tenant from escaping, but the tenant throws him inside the piano and into the trunk with the rest. Leaving only a small chest of drawers in the room, the tenant pulls a ladder from his valise and climbs out the window. The male janitor hurries in, accompanied by the owner of the building and another policeman. Finding only the chest of drawers, which is dancing around of its own accord, the three men attack it with sticks. It explodes in a huge burst of smoke, knocking the men to the ground and bringing plaster and beams down from the ceiling.

== Cast ==
Méliès's films have no closing credits, but the following cast list can be reconstructed from recollections by Georges Méliès's son, André Méliès.

- Georges Méliès as the diabolic tenant. Méliès acted in at least 300 of his 520 films.
- André Méliès as the family's young child. The previous year, when he was seven years old, he had played the lead role in his father's film A Grandmother's Story. André Méliès grew up to be a professional actor and operetta singer, and played his father in Georges Franju's 1952 biographical film Le Grand Méliès.
- François Lallement as the young soldier in the family. Lallement was one of Méliès's salaried cameramen; he had previously appeared onscreen as the officer of marines in A Trip to the Moon.
- Charles Claudel as the male janitor. Claudel was one of the artists who painted scenery based on Méliès's designs.
- Octavie Huvier as the female janitor. Huvier was a maidservant for the Méliès family.

== Production ==
The Diabolic Tenant is an expanded treatment of plot ideas that had previously appeared in an earlier Méliès film, Satan in Prison. Méliès's concept of large things coming from a small bag returned in later films, including Walt Disney's Mary Poppins and Jerry Lewis's Hardly Working. The film's special effects were created using pyrotechnics, stage machinery, and furniture props moved by people hidden inside them, including the young André Méliès. The only cinematic effect used in the film is the editing technique known as the substitution splice.

As is typical for Méliès's work, most of the action is filmed in long shots. Unusually, the actors also briefly come closer to the camera, in medium shot—probably to clarify the action by showing the janitor's expression of astonishment more clearly.

John Frazer, in a 1979 book on Méliès, argued that The Diabolic Tenant could be read as an autobiographical film about the director's own financial difficulties. A 1981 Centre national de la cinématographie guide to Méliès's films disputes Frazer's interpretation, noting that it is mistaken on plot details and arguing that Méliès was not in serious financial trouble until he began business negotiations with Pathé Frères in 1911.
