= Fat and Lean Wrestling Match =

1900 film by Georges Méliès

- Directed by: Georges Méliès
- Starring: Jehanne d'Alcy
- Production company: Star Film Company
- Release date: 1900
- Running time: Approx. 1 min.
- Country: France
- Language: Silent

Nouvelles Luttes extravagantes, known in English as Fat and Lean Wrestling Match and as The Wrestling Sextette, is a 1900 French silent trick film directed by Georges Méliès.

== Plot ==
On a wrestling mat, two women change magically out of wrestling outfits into street clothes, and then change into male wrestlers, who pummel each other exaggeratedly. One of them takes the other apart, then reassembles him. The women reappear and all four wrestlers take a bow.

Two more wrestlers enter, a hefty man and a slim man. The hefty one flattens the other like a pancake and rolls him up, but the thin man comes back to life and the wrestling resumes. The hefty man is blown apart, but his limbs magically return to his torso and all is well.

== Production ==
As wrestling was a common carnival attraction in turn-of-the-century France, it was a topic of special interest to the fairground exhibitors to whom Méliès marketed his films. Méliès found opportunity to parody such wrestling bouts multiple times, with Nouvelles Luttes extravagantes a notable example. Méliès had previously played with the theme of a body being taken apart and reassembled in "The Recalcitrant Decapitated Man," a successful stage illusion at the Théâtre Robert-Houdin.

The backdrop for the film suggests a setting near the Bosphorus. Special effects used in the film include pyrotechnics, mannequins, black wires put on the ground to manipulate the detached parts of the body, and substitution splices. The smaller of the two female wrestlers is played by Jehanne d'Alcy.

== Release and reception ==
Nouvelles Luttes extravagantes was sold by Méliès's Star Film Company and is numbered 309–310 in its catalogues. It was sold as in the United States as Fat and Lean Wrestling Match and in the United Kingdom as The Wrestling Sextette. In a 1979 book on Méliès, film historian John Frazer commented: "The humor is crude but full of surreal anarchy." Film critic William B. Parrill, reviewing silent films in the 2010s, rated the film "trivial and highly amusing".

Two different versions of Nouvelles Luttes extravagantes are known to survive; they feature the same cast and the same backdrop, but use slightly different set dressing, and each features an acrobatic sequence not found in the other.
