= Rogues' Tricks =

1907 film by Georges Méliès

- Directed by: Georges Méliès
- Starring: Georges Méliès
- Production company: Star Film Company
- Release date: 1907
- Country: France
- Language: Silent

Rogues' Tricks (French: La Douche d'eau bouillante, literally "The Shower of Boiling Water"), also known as The Burglar's Bath, is a 1907 French short silent comedy film by Georges Méliès. The film stars Méliès as the comic foil of two rogues who break into his house and evade his attempts to capture them.

== Plot ==
Two vagrants break through a window into an opulently furnished house. They hide in a closet just as the owner of the house, a bearded gentleman, enters. The owner, astonished by the mess the vagrants have made, berates his housemaid. A glazier comes in to fix the window.

As the glazier works, the vagrants escape into the bathroom. Hearing a noise, they jump into the empty bathtub and hide under the tub's wooden cover. The noise is the owner, coming in to take a bath; he lights a match to the hot water heater, and gets a jet of hot water pouring into the tub. The vagrants, taken by surprise, start to jump involuntarily, and the owner realizes they are there. He tries to contain them by sitting on the cover, but they wrangle free, and the owner lands in the bathwater.

The owner jumps out of the bathtub and runs in pursuit of the escaping vagrants, who again escape to the closet. The owner crashes into the glazier with a shatter of glass, fires off a rifle that hits his housemaid, and finally ends up in the closet, which topples over.

== Production and themes ==
Méliès plays the owner of the house. Unlike his more famous fantasy films, Rogues' Tricks is purely a broad comedy; beyond some basic pyrotechnics, the only special effects are two substitution splices used for editing purposes.

The film is a rare example of Méliès playing a character who is not in control of a situation, and who ends up foiled; another such example is his film The Eclipse, or the Courtship of the Sun and Moon, made later the same year. A Méliès guide published by the Centre national de la cinématographie comments on this phenomenon: "When he plays the role of the Devil, he wins. When he represents Authority (here the owner, in The Eclipse the professor) he loses."

== Release ==
The film was sold by Méliès's Star Film Company and is numbered 909–911 in its catalogues. It was sold as Rogues' Tricks in the United States, and as The Burglar's Bath in the United Kingdom; Rogues' Tricks is the title used on the title card in a surviving print of the film. A restoration supervised by David Shepard, with a Photoplayer musical accompaniment by Joe Rinaudo, was released on home video in 2008 as part of a Méliès collection.
