= Théâtre Robert-Houdin =

Paris theatre

Coordinates: 48.8719°N 2.3386°E

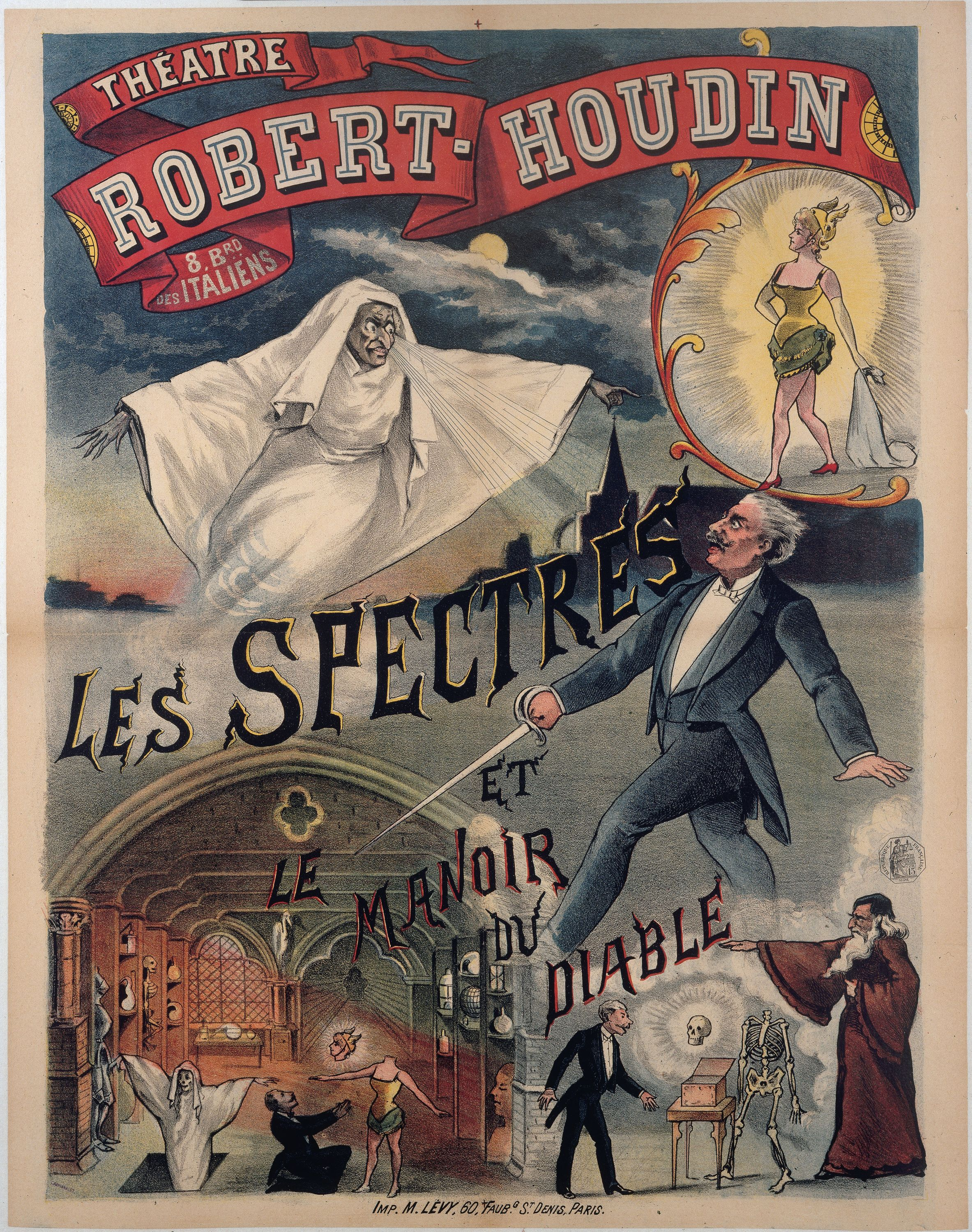
Undated poster for the Théâtre Robert-Houdin

The Théâtre Robert-Houdin, initially advertised as the Théâtre des Soirées Fantastiques de Robert-Houdin, was a Paris theatre dedicated primarily to the performance of stage illusions. Founded by the famous magician Jean-Eugène Robert-Houdin in 1845 at No. 164 Galerie Valois as part of the Palais-Royal, it moved in 1852 to a permanent home at No. 8, Boulevard des Italiens. The theatre's later directors, before its demolition in 1924, included Robert-Houdin's protégé Hamilton and the illusionist and film innovator Georges Méliès.

When he first founded the theatre, Robert-Houdin was known primarily for his guest appearances as a magician and his clever mechanical inventions. Eager to solidify his work as a stage performer, he leased assembly rooms in the Palais-Royal and had them converted into a small but elegant proscenium theatre auditorium. In setting his stage, Robert-Houdin deliberately set himself apart from conventional stage-magic traditions; he eschewed the usual emphasis on dazzling visual confusion, replacing it with a simple drawing-room look with light furniture in the Style Louis XV. After a rocky start, his theatre gained critical respect, and boomed in popularity with the introduction of Robert-Houdin's mind-reading illusion "Second Sight".

In early 1852, Robert-Houdin transferred the theatre's directorship to his former pupil Hamilton (born Pierre Etienne Chocat), who continued its success. At the end of that year, when the lease on the Palais-Royal location ran out, Hamilton moved his operation to a boulevard theatre venue on the Boulevard des Italiens. In its new permanent location, the theatre continued to run for the next few decades, under directors including Cleverman (born François Lahire), Pierre Edouard Brunnet, and Émile Voisin. A drastic refreshing of the theatre's repertoire in the mid-1870s gave it a major financial boost, with the added box-office takings allowing it to start hosting guest artists. However, the boom did not last long, and the theatre was physically run-down and in a serious financial slump by the mid-1880s.

In 1888, Georges Méliès took over the lease on the venue. He retained its existing staff but began a thorough revamping, aiming to restore both the theatre's architecture and its repertoire to their former quality. His first major innovation was to conclude each evening's entertainment with a spectacularly staged, lavishly advertised illusion, telling a miniature story complete with original scenery and costumed characters. Méliès's restorations and innovations were a marked success. In 1896, when moving pictures were an emerging novelty, he added film projection to the theatre's repertoire, and even began making his own films to show there and sell elsewhere. Over the next fifteen years, filmmaking became a major part of his career, on top of and overlapping with his work at the theatre. A 1901 fire destroyed most of the venue, but the theatre was rebuilt the same year and continued to present performances with success.

At the onset of the First World War, the theatre was closed; Méliès, now severely in debt from a series of filmmaking-related troubles, was unable to keep it going, and sublet it as a full-time cinema. He shut down the venue in 1923, when he sold all his property in an attempt to pay his debts. Paris city planners demolished the theatre the following year to allow for an extension of the Boulevard Haussmann.

== The Palais-Royal years, 1845–1852 ==
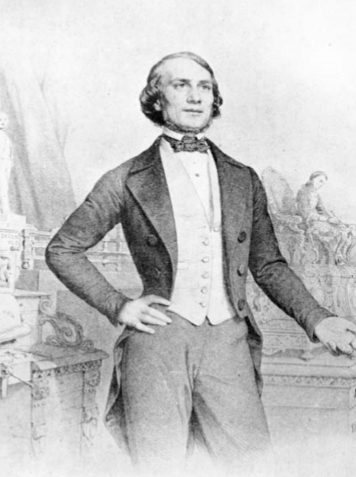
Portrait of Robert‐Houdin

In the early 1840s, the innovative magician Jean-Eugène Robert-Houdin was well-regarded, particularly for the mechanical curiosities he exhibited to audiences and sold to rich patrons. He performed with a trick automaton at the French Industrial Exposition of 1844, drawing guests including King Louis Philippe I, and winning a silver medal from the exposition judges. He was keen to expand his magical performances by opening his own venue, and a nobleman who had hired him for private parties, the Count de L'Escalopier, invested fifteen thousand francs into the project.

In 1845, the theatre was launched inside the Palais-Royal. This building, once home to Cardinal Richelieu, had been converted into a lavish shopping arcade, with shops and cafés on the ground floor and assembly rooms above them. Robert-Houdin and de L'Escalopier leased assembly rooms at No. 164 Galerie Valois, and had carpenters knock down interior walls to create an auditorium, with a seating capacity of about two hundred. The decorations were in the Style Louis XV, with white walls and gold trim, and Robert-Houdin's proscenium stage was set up as an elegant drawing-room, complete with candelabras and drapery.

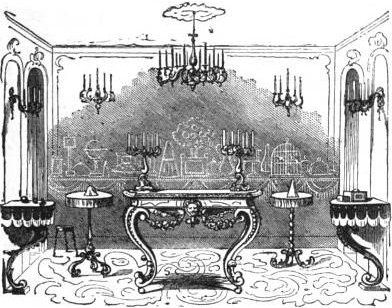
Robert-Houdin's sketch of his stage

Robert-Houdin set himself apart from previous magic acts in his stage setting; while some other magicians had tried to dazzle with elaborate, purely ornamental props and lighting effects, and abundant use of tables covered with cloth to the floor, Robert-Houdin hoped to impress by sticking to the relatively simple Style Louis XV and limiting the furniture to the minimum needed for his act. Folding doors on both sides of the stage allowed Robert-Houdin to bring his elaborate mechanical devices on and offstage; the door at the right led to a room looking out over the Palais-Royal's garden. He used this room as a green room when preparing in the evening, and as a workshop during the day.

Robert-Houdin initially advertised the venue as the "Théâtre des Soirées Fantastiques de Robert-Houdin", but this name was soon abridged to "Théâtre Robert-Houdin". Ticket prices were set relatively high to make up for the auditorium's small capacity, with prices between two and five francs depending on the position of the seat.

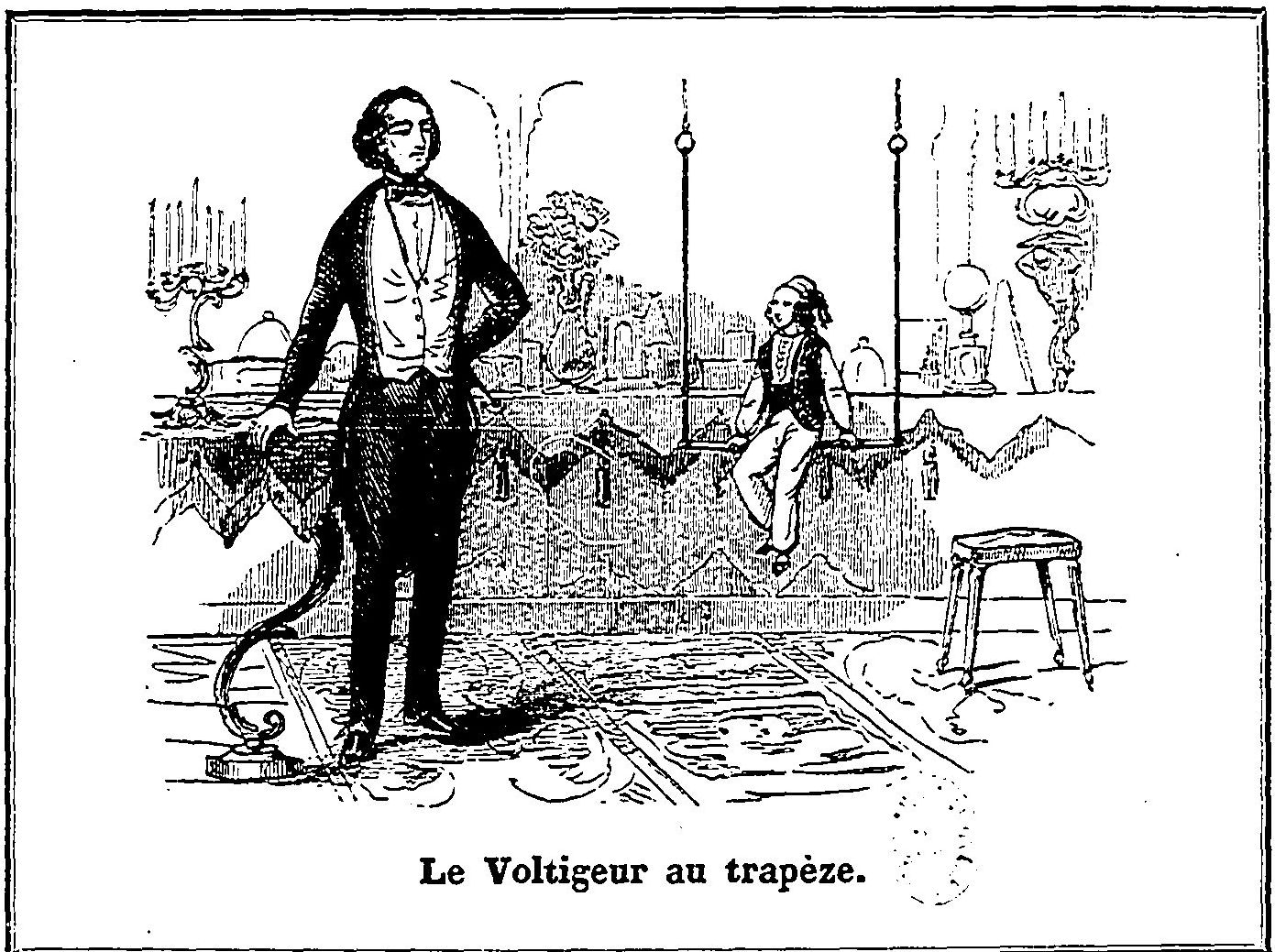
Robert-Houdin performing with an automaton on his stage

The theatre opened on 3 July 1845, competing directly with the gala opening of a major Paris amphitheatre, the Hippodrome de l'Étoile. No critics covered Robert-Houdin's first performance, and his memoirs describe it as an artistic failure wrecked by stage fright. However, Robert-Houdin persevered, and slowly began to regain his cool and win critical attention for the theatre. His performances were varied, including mechanically assisted acts like "The Fantastic Orange Tree" and trick automatons like "The Pastrycook of the Palais-Royal". Reviews in Le Charivari and L'Illustration were favourable, comparing the theatre's offerings to those of famous magicians like Bartolomeo Bosco and Philippe Talon.

On 12 February 1846, Robert-Houdin added a fresh act to the repertoire: "Second Sight", adapted and expanded from earlier magicians' routines. In this act, Robert-Houdin's son Émile, though blindfolded, contrived to answer questions about objects volunteered by audience members. "Second Sight" rocketed Robert-Houdin and his theatre to immense success and packed houses. Once the theatre had won good business, Robert-Houdin closed it for the summer of 1846 to go on tour, bringing in new tricks for the fall season, including a levitation act, "Ethereal Suspension". Over the next few years, Robert-Houdin continued the pattern of performing at his own theatre in between extended bouts of touring and tinkering.

In 1851, Robert-Houdin announced publicly that he was entrusting to the theatre to a successor and former pupil, Pierre Etienne Chocat, who performed under the name Hamilton. The transferral, effected in January 1852, went smoothly, with the Theatre Robert-Houdin still doing good business under its new management.

== The move to the Boulevard, 1852–1888 ==
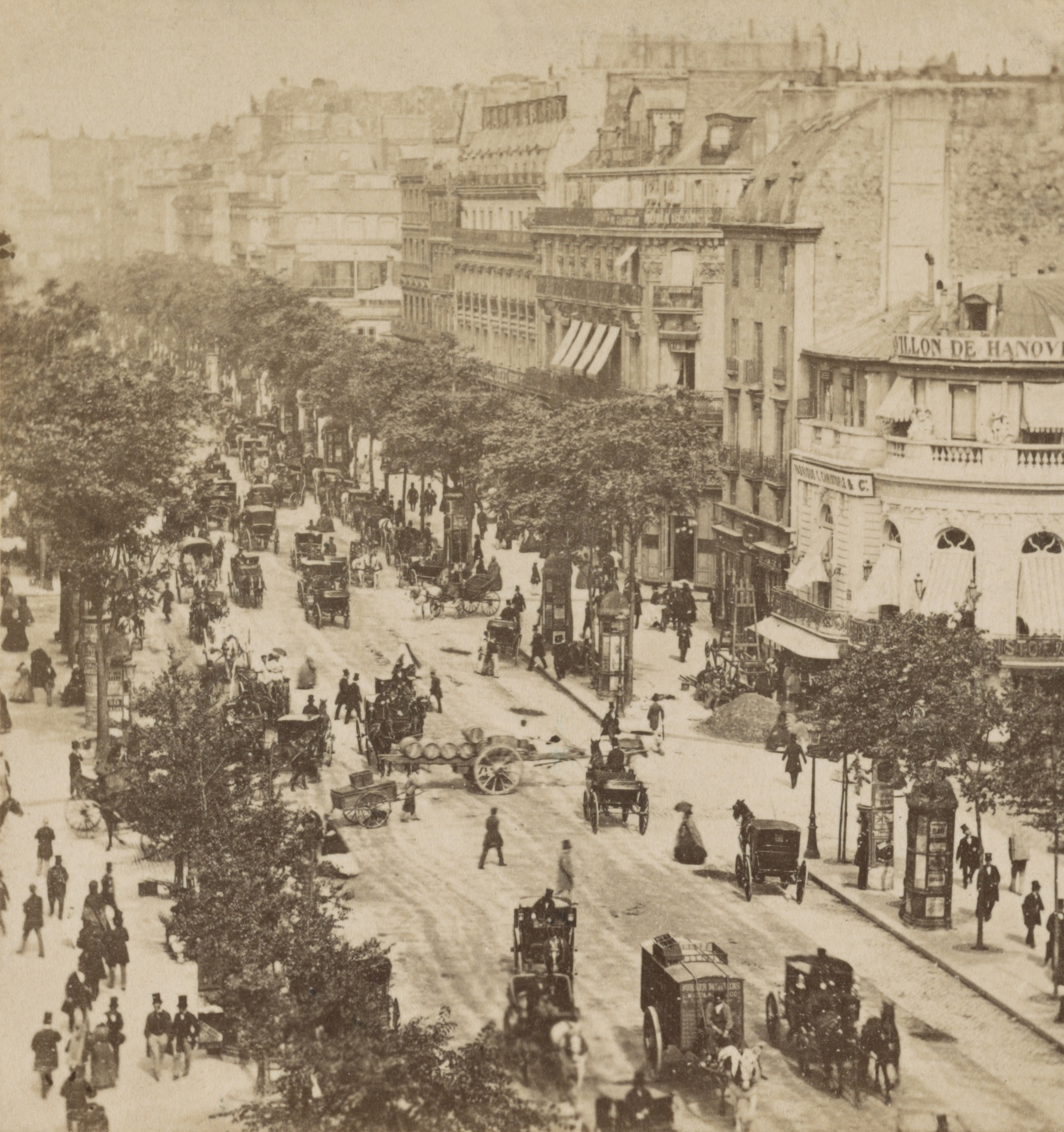
The Boulevard des Italiens in the 1860s

The lease on the Palais-Royal rooms ran out in December 1852. Rather than renewing it, Hamilton moved his operation to a building at No. 8, Boulevard des Italiens. To inaugurate the new theatre in January 1853, Jean-Eugène Robert-Houdin gave the first performance, along with good wishes to his successor Hamilton.

The new location turned the Théâtre Robert-Houdin into a boulevard theatre, one of the entertainment venues that flourished in Paris during and after the city's 1853–1870 urban renewal. The rebuilding of Paris during this period, led by Georges-Eugène Haussmann, created a "boulevard culture" that lasted throughout the second half of the nineteenth century. Boulevard theatres were smaller than established venues like the Comédie-Française, and produced more varied and experimental shows. The Boulevard des Italiens was a locus of entertainment technology during this period; numerous photographic studios operated near the Théâtre Robert-Houdin, and from 1899 onward the Pathé brothers ran a phonograph salon on the boulevard.

After a performing career of eleven years, Jean-Eugène Robert-Houdin moved on to writing and retirement; he died in June 1871. The Théatre Robert-Houdin continued, with Hamilton being replaced first by François Lahire, who performed as Cleverman, and then by Pierre Edouard Brunnet, whose innovations included the locked-trunk escape artist act "Malle des Indes". In the mid-1870s, the theatre's repertoire received a thorough refreshing and revamping, to considerable popular success; box-office takings were reported to have jumped up 42% between 1876 and 1878. The additional funds allowed the theatre to begin hosting a wide variety of guest artists, including mimics, marionette puppeteers, and mental calculator acts.

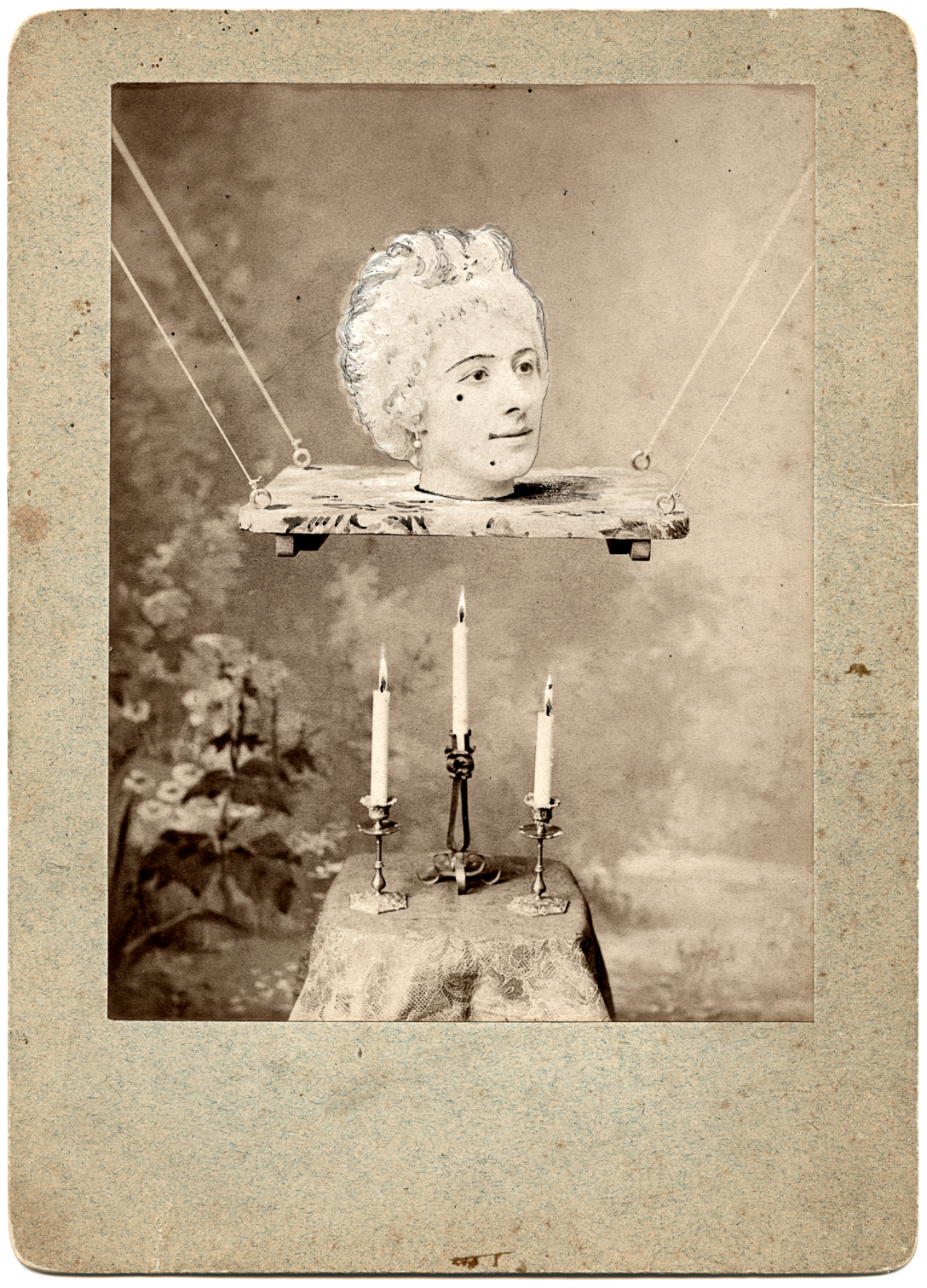
Jehanne d'Alcy playing a disembodied head in the 1892 illusion "La Source enchantée"

After the popularity boom of the mid-1870s, the Robert-Houdin became immersed in grave financial difficulties. By 1878, complaints were being raised that the theatre was not adequately advertising its guest artists, a problem that appears to have diminished its reputation among Parisian theatres. By the mid-1880s the theatre had fallen into a state of disrepair, and its acts were seen as falling off in quality.

The theatre eventually landed under the directorship of Émile Voisin, otherwise a manufacturer of props for magic acts. In 1887, Voisin hired Stéphanie Faës, an actor who performed under the name Jehanne d'Alcy. In part because she was small and agile, d'Alcy proved a valuable performer for magic illusions, and appeared in them regularly.

== The Méliès refurbishment, 1888–1896 ==
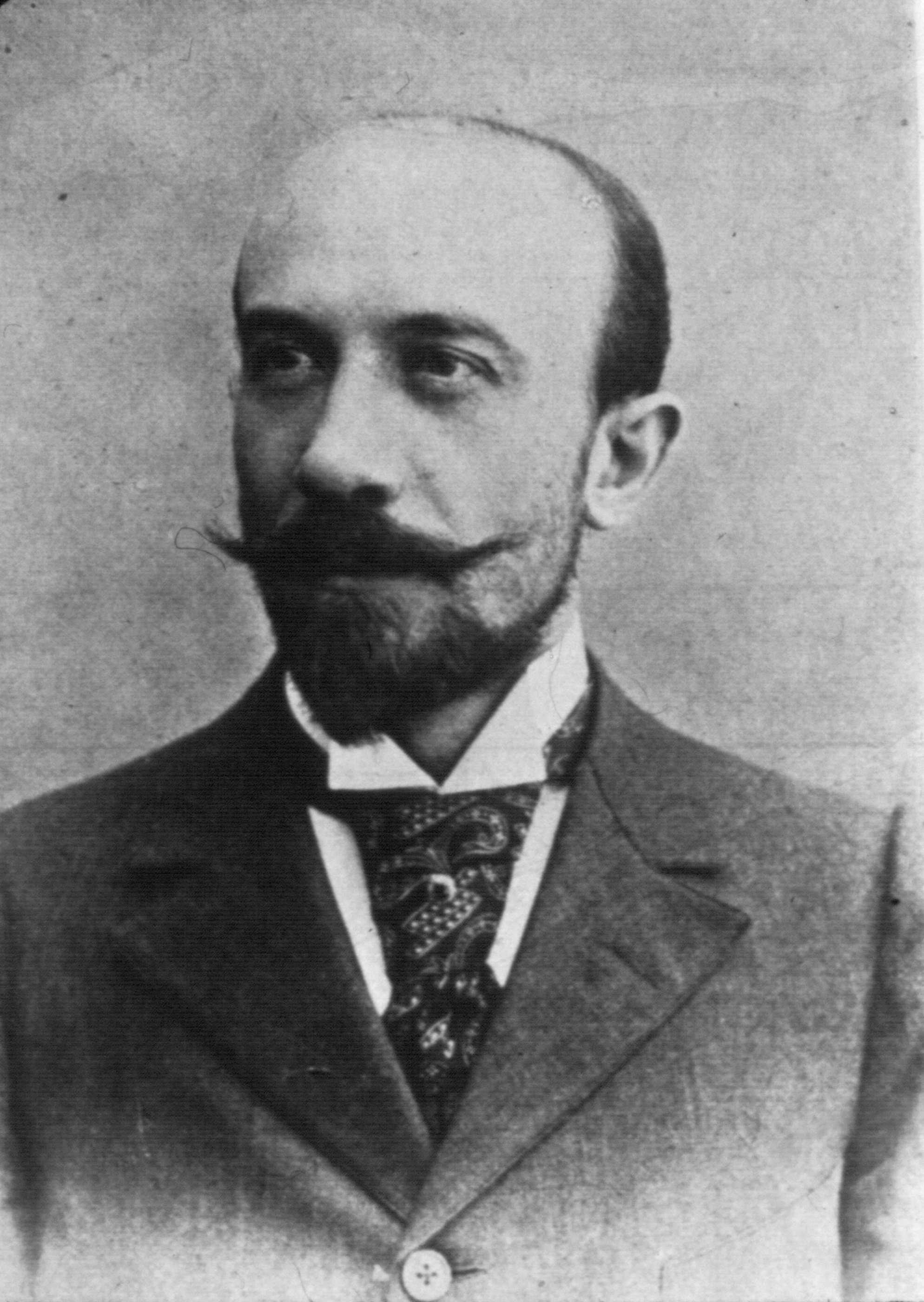
Georges Méliès in 1895

In July 1888, the theatre came under the directorship of Georges Méliès. Méliès was a rising young magician who had performed at salons, at the Galerie Vivienne, and at the Musée Grévin; his father was a shoe manufacturer who had retired earlier in 1888, splitting up his fortune between his three sons. While his brothers Henri and Gaston took over the shoe business, Georges Méliès used his share of the money to rent the Théâtre Robert-Houdin from the site's owner, the Count de Rohan-Chabot. Méliès also bought up the theatre's properties from the widow of Émile Robert-Houdin, the magician's son, and retained the whole staff, including performers like d'Alcy, from Voisin's directorship.

Méliès, who had been a frequent and enthusiastic audience member at the Robert-Houdin, was keen to refurbish the aging venue and bring its acts back to the standard of quality set by Robert-Houdin himself. He designed new scenery, had the walls repainted and the draperies replaced, and worked with another magician, Duperrey, to plan a performance repertoire with original material. Though Méliès continued the theatre's tradition of straightforward magic acts and trick automaton exhibits, his plan also included a major innovation: every evening's entertainment would conclude with one of his "grand tricks" ("grands trucs"), large-scale illusions that were staged lavishly and advertised to match, with detailed press announcements and separate posters. In December 1888, Méliès reopened the theatre, complete with his first grand trick, "The Persian Stroubaika" ("La Stroubaïka persane").

Under Méliès's directorship, the struggling theatre returned to public prominence, and its box office flourished. In 1889 he premiered three new illusions: "The Mysterious Page" ("Le Page mystérieux"), with d'Alcy in the title role; "The Flower Fairy, or Cagliostro's Mirror" ("La Fée des fleurs ou le Miroir de Cagliostro"); and "The Enchanter Alcofrisbas" ("L'Enchanteur Alcofrisbas"). In all, Méliès would create some thirty illusions for the theatre between 1888 and 1910.

Although he played roles in the illusions he created, Méliès rarely appeared "as himself" in a straightforward conjuring role, unless one of the featured magicians became suddenly unavailable and Méliès needed to fill in. Illusions were accompanied by piano improvisation; he mentions nine Robert-Houdin pianists in his written recollections, including the composer Caroline Chelu.

== Stage and film combinations, 1896–1901 ==
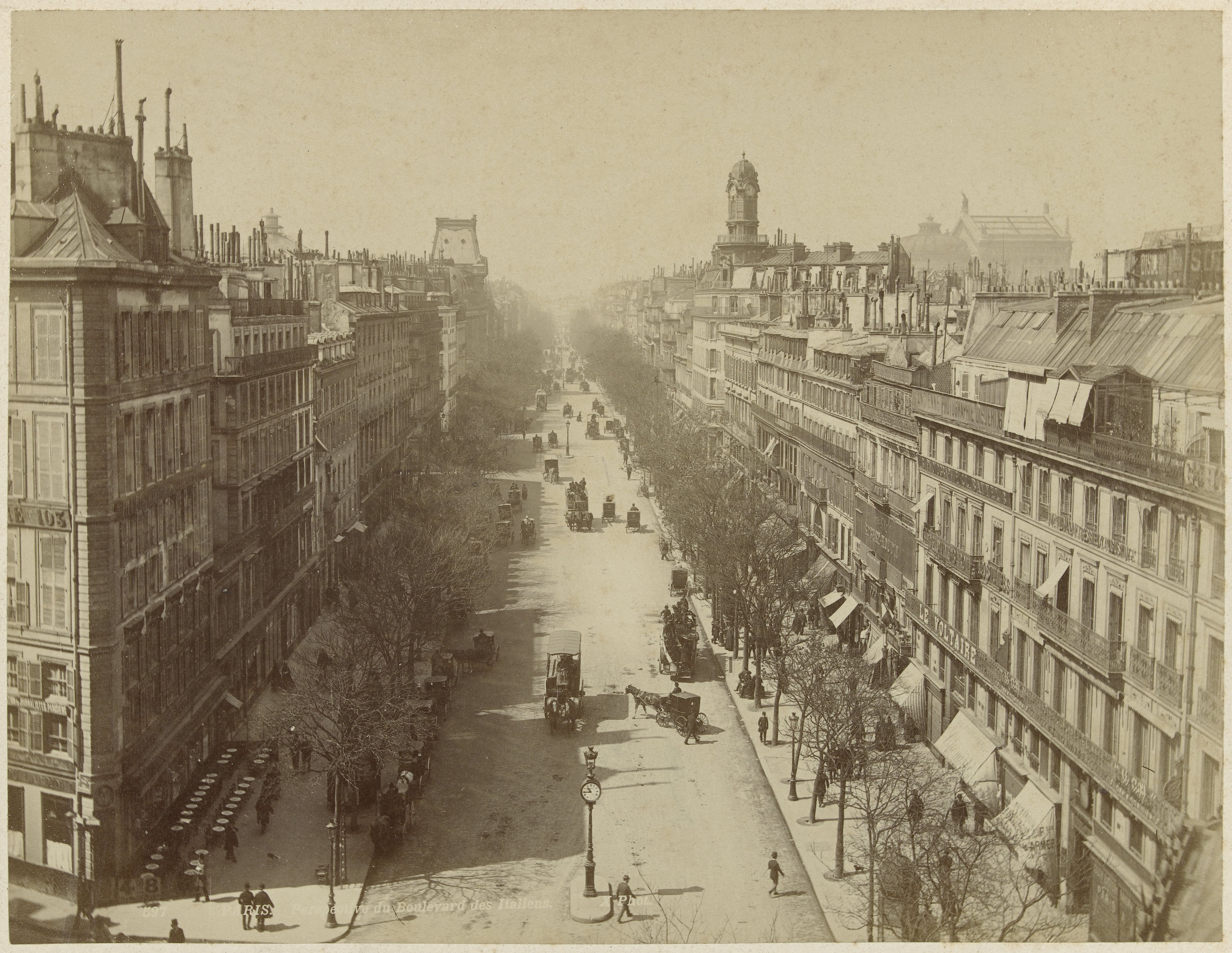
The Boulevard des Italiens in the late nineteenth century; the Théâtre Robert-Houdin is in the mid-foreground at right

In April 1896, films were projected at the theatre for the first time, using a Theatrograph projector that Méliès had obtained from the film pioneer Robert W. Paul. Méliès would convert the projector into a makeshift camera and begin making his own films in May of that same year. Previously, performances at the theatre had often concluded with a magic lantern show, with hand-coloured slides of photographic views; with the coming of the film projector, Méliès replaced these still images with moving film.

Méliès noted later that his first choice would have been to film inside the Robert-Houdin, but he was foiled by his camera's need for much stronger light sources, preferably natural light. According to one recollection, Méliès did attempt on one occasion to film inside the theatre, setting up fifteen arc lamps and fifteen mercury-vapor lamps to make the 1897 series Comedian Paulus Singing, the first known use of artificial light in film. However, the experiment with artificial light was not repeated.

In early 1897, Méliès constructed a purpose-built glass studio on his family's property in Montreuil-sous-Bois, exactly reproducing the dimensions of the Robert-Houdin. With the building of the studio, he became more and more occupied with filmmaking, drastically reducing his output of new stage illusions; he premiered only four new illusions at the theatre between 1897 and 1910.

Although Méliès's stage output was reduced, his films were regularly projected as part of the entertainment at the Robert-Houdin. From September through December 1902, a hand-colored print of A Trip to the Moon was screened at the theatre after Saturday and Thursday matinee performances. It was presented there by Méliès's colleague and fellow magician, Jules-Eugène Legris, who also appeared in the film's final scenes as the leader of a parade.

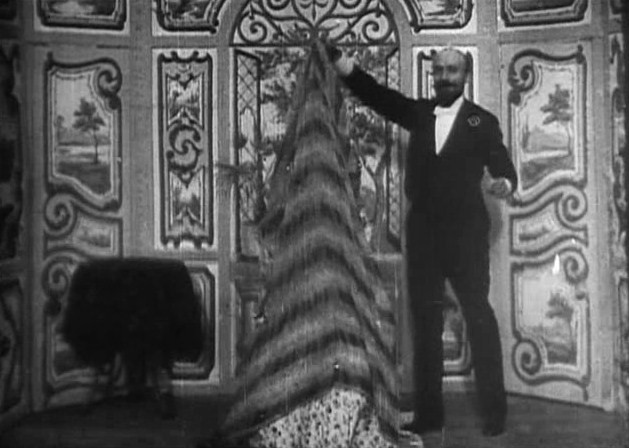
Méliès's film version of The Vanishing Lady

In addition, Méliès's films were often conceived as filmed equivalents of the illusions staged at the Robert-Houdin. One of his first important films, The Vanishing Lady, has as its full French title Escomotage d'une dame chez Robert-Houdin ("Disappearance of a Lady at the Robert-Houdin"); film historian André Gaudreault argues that the same ending could be added to Méliès's other titles, turning, for example, Le Bourreau turc into Le Bourreau turc chez Robert-Houdin ("The Turkish Executioner at the Robert-Houdin") or L'Omnibus des toqués into L'Omnibus des toqués chez Robert-Houdin ("The Omnibus of Loonies at the Robert-Houdin"). Méliès himself declared: "My cinematographic career was connected so closely to the career of the Théâtre Robert-Houdin, that one can hardly separate them." (Note: "Ma carrière cinématographique est tellement liée à celle du Théâtre Robert-Houdin, qu'on ne peut guère les séparer.")

Méliès's second film, Conjuring (1896), is derived from one of his magic acts at the Robert-Houdin, as is The Miracles of the Brahmin (1900) and Coppelia, the Animated Doll (also 1900). Tom Old Boot (1896) captures a performance by a small entertainer of the same name, who was playing at the Robert-Houdin at the time as a "nain americain" ("American dwarf"). The Living Playing Cards (1905) was inspired by an act performed at the Robert-Houdin by Gaston Velle, who would himself later become a director of Méliès-like trick films for Pathé Frères.

Under Méliès, the theatre's offerings included an annual revue, Passez Muscade. The 1899 edition mixed stage performances with filmed attractions, and included two topical parodies of the rival magician Buatier de Kolta, caricaturing him as a pompous magician with the similar-sounding name "Moitié de Polka", and spoofing his illusion "Le Miracle". (A 1908 Méliès film, also titled Moitié de polka, may have adapted this parody, but the film is currently presumed lost.)

Méliès kept the Théâtre running continuously for most of the year, with an annual brief closing for summer vacation (for example, 14 July to 31 July in 1896, during which Méliès took his family to the coast of Normandy and made numerous actuality films).

== Rebuilding after fire, 1901–1908 ==
The Théâtre Robert-Houdin was partly destroyed by a fire on 30 January 1901. The Count de Rohan-Chabot applied for municipal approval to have it rebuilt, and authorization was granted in May–June 1901, though the authorities noted that the building would be affected should plans for extending the Boulevard Haussmann go through. The rebuilt theatre opened on 22 September. Charles Claudel, an artist who had painted scenery for many of Méliès's films, contributed three large paintings of a sorcerer, a conjurer, and a Louis XV-era magician, as well as a ceiling mural depicting some of Robert-Houdin's famous automatons. The rebuilt interior maintained the original white-and-gold colour scheme, with drapery and upholstery in pale green. Méliès was present for the grand re-opening, but later recalled that he was on crutches, from an accident he sustained while filming Blue Beard.

On 6 December 1905, the theatre hosted the French Society of Magicians celebrating Robert-Houdin's hundredth birthday. Several prominent Paris magicians presented illusions, and Méliès performed with one of Robert-Houdin's original automatons, "Antonio Diavolo". In 1910, Méliès had the theatre present a benefit performance for victims of the 1910 Great Flood of Paris.

A 1903 guidebook reported:

The successor of the famous Robert-Houdin, the prestidigitateur, in his small but well-appointed theatre, caters chiefly for children and young people of both sexes, but so skilful is he at his performances, that children of larger growth are delighted to be numbered amongst his audiences. The tricks performed are really marvellous and amusing—often of real dramatic interest, and ever and anon finished comedy.

Harry Houdini, in his 1908 book The Unmasking of Robert-Houdin, acknowledged that the Théâtre Robert-Houdin was a "historic temple of magic". He reported that some Parisians assumed that Jean-Eugène Robert-Houdin himself "was still alive and giving performances at the theatre which bears his name."

== Final years, 1914–1924 ==
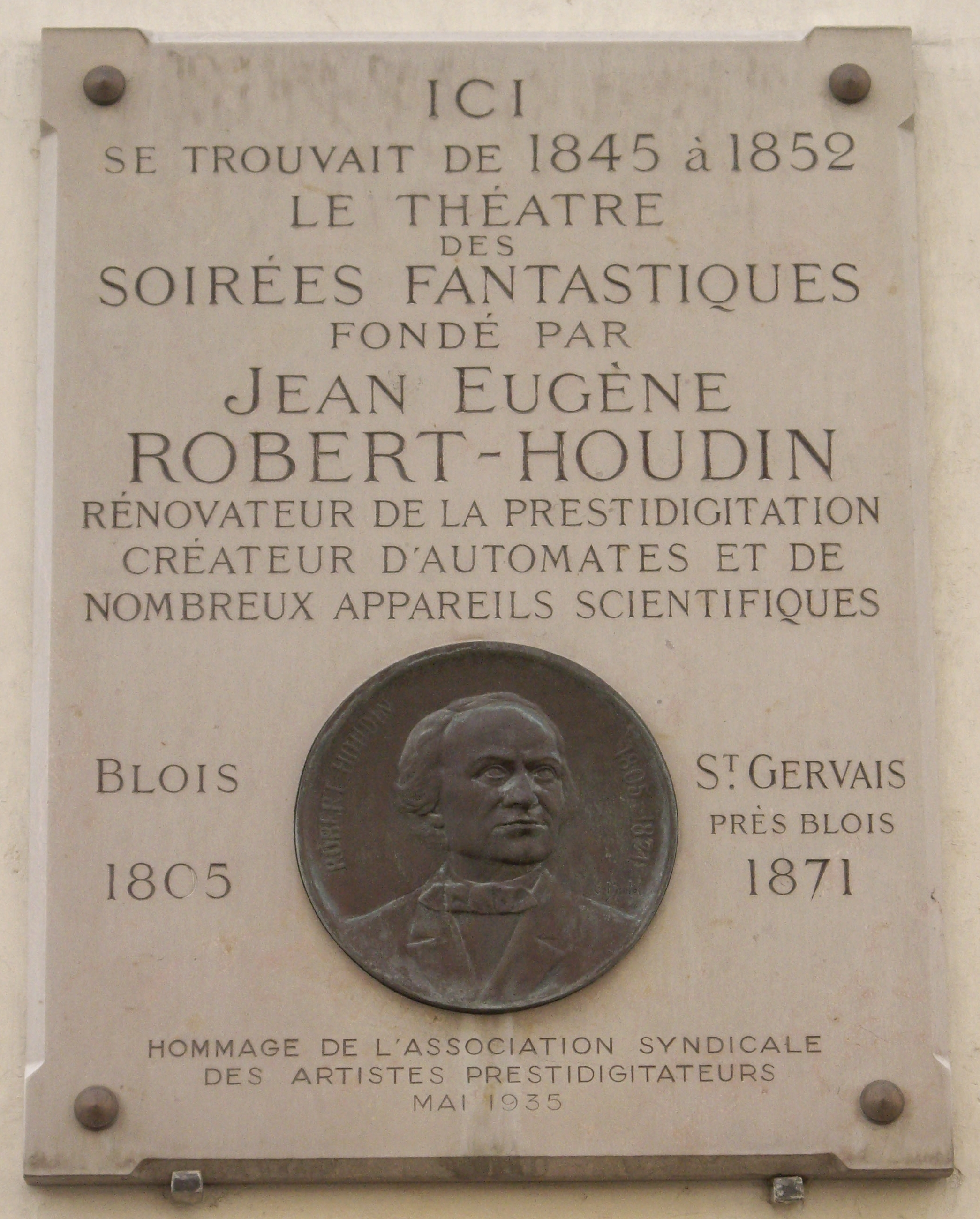
Plaque commemorating the theatre's first site

At the beginning of the First World War in August 1914, Méliès closed and sublet the theatre. It reopened nine months later as a full-time cinema house, the Ciné-Salon Robert-Houdin, no longer under Méliès's directorship.

In the ensuing years, Méliès's debts grew worse, including those to Pathé regarding funds for making his last films. He sold his land, including his film studios, and shut down the Théatre Robert-Houdin completely in 1923. Méliès destroyed his entire collection of his films, more than 500 in all, the same year.

In 1924, Numbers 2 through 18 on the Boulevard des Italiens, including the Théâtre Robert-Houdin at No. 8 and the Passage de l'Opéra at No. 10, were demolished to make room for an extension of the Boulevard Haussmann.

== Notes ==
=== Citations ===
- Anonymous (1903), Pleasure Guide to Paris for Bachelors, translated by Day, George, London: Nilsson and Company
- Anonymous (2000), "Cartes vivantes, Les", Giornate Database, Pordenone Silent Film Festival
- Barnier, Martin (2014), "Le son féerique de Méliès", in Malthête, Jacques; Gaudreault, André; Le Forestier, Laurent (eds.), Méliès, carrefour des attractions; suivi de Correspondances de Georges Méliès (1904-1937), Rennes: Presses universitaires de Rennes, pp. 73–83
- Christopher, Milbourne; Christopher, Maurine (1996), The Illustrated History of Magic, Portsmouth, NH: Heinemann
- Essai de reconstitution du catalogue français de la Star-Film; suivi d'une analyse catalographique des films de Georges Méliès recensés en France, Bois d'Arcy: Service des archives du film du Centre national de la cinématographie, 1981, ISBN 2903053073
- Evans, Henry Ridgely (1909), The Old and the New Magic, Chicago: The Open Court Publishing Company
- Frazer, John (1979), Artificially Arranged Scenes: The Films of Georges Méliès, Boston: G. K. Hall & Co., ISBN 0816183686
- Gaudreault, André (2014), "La cinématographie-attraction chez Méliès: Une conception durable", in Malthête, Jacques; Gaudreault, André; Le Forestier, Laurent (eds.), Méliès, carrefour des attractions; suivi de Correspondances de Georges Méliès (1904-1937), Rennes: Presses universitaires de Rennes, pp. 27–43
- Guido, Laurent (2014), "De la performance scénique à la ciné-chorégraphie: Les avatars de la danse chez Georges Méliès", in Malthête, Jacques; Gaudreault, André; Le Forestier, Laurent (eds.), Méliès, carrefour des attractions; suivi de Correspondances de Georges Méliès (1904-1937), Rennes: Presses universitaires de Rennes, pp. 63–72
- Houdini, Harry (1908), The Unmasking of Robert-Houdin, New York: Publisher's Printing Company
- Kessler, Frank; Lenk, Sabine (1997), "L'addresse-Méliès", in Malthête, Jacques; Marie, Michel (eds.), Georges Méliès, l'illusionniste fin de siècle?: actes du colloque de Cerisy-la-Salle, 13–22 août 1996, Paris: Presses de la Sorbonne nouvelle, pp. 183–199, ISBN 9782878541403
- Malthête, Jacques; Mannoni, Laurent (2002), Méliès: magie et cinéma, Paris: Paris-Musées, p. 233
- Malthête, Jacques; Mannoni, Laurent (2008), L'oeuvre de Georges Méliès, Paris: Éditions de La Martinière, ISBN 9782732437323
- Pfluger, David; Chen, Ya-Wen; Hasler, Oliver (November 2018), Visiting Georges Melies: A Cinematic World Lost And Found. A 3D Model Of The Boulevard Des Italiens, Where Early Cinema Emerged (conference paper), Berlin: 25th Berlin EVA
- Rivière-Petitot, Anne (n.d.), "L'énigme Charles Claudel (1873-?)", Association Camille Claudel, archived from the original on 20 December 2014
- Robert-Houdin, [Jean-Eugène] (1881), The Secrets of Stage Conjuring, translated by Professor Hoffmann [Angelo Lewis, pseud.], London: George Routledge and Sons
- Solomon, Matthew (2011), "Introduction", in Solomon, Matthew (ed.), Fantastic Voyages of the Cinematic Imagination: Georges Méliès's Trip to the Moon, Albany: State University of New York Press, pp. 1–24, ISBN 978-1-4384-3581-7
- Tabet, Frédéric (2014), "Méliès et les artistes magiciens: Éléments de lecture d'une écriture magique virtuose", in Malthête, Jacques; Gaudreault, André; Le Forestier, Laurent (eds.), Méliès, carrefour des attractions; suivi de Correspondances de Georges Méliès (1904-1937), Rennes: Presses universitaires de Rennes, pp. 87–95
