= Aerial suspension =

Magic illusion

Aerial suspension illusion
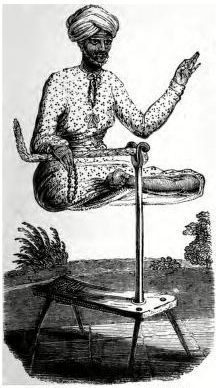
- Sheshal performing aerial suspension illusion
- Medium: Funfair, circus, theatre
- Types: Magic (illusion)
- Originating culture: India and europe
- Originating era: 1830s

The aerial suspension, ethereal suspension or broomstick illusion is an illusion in which the performer appears to be suspended in mid-air for some minutes, with either inadequate support or no apparent support of the performer's weight. This trick was first recorded in India and Europe in the early 19th century.

== Early performers ==
This illusion was first recorded by Thomas Frost in Lives of the Conjurors, 1876, as a performance by an old Brahmin in India in 1828 or 1829. The Brahmin died in 1830 without explaining his trick. He was followed by Sheshal, the Brahmin of the Air, who exhibited the illusion at Madras in 1832, apparently using only a stool, a hollow piece of bamboo, a piece of hide and some beads (pictured). Frost thought that it was "probably not very far from the truth" that there were supporting steel rods concealed within the bamboo and the hide, and that the rods were connected with a seat concealed within the performer's robes. The performer was set in place behind a screen.

=== Ching Lau Lauro ===
The first recorded instance of it in Europe was performed in 1832 or 1833 by Ching Lau Lauro in England, and known as sitting in the air upon nothing. In an early version, he appeared to be just touching his hand against some beads hung on a hollow bamboo pole, which in turn was set in a wooden stool. In reality the bamboo, his hand and loose Chinese or buffo costume concealed iron bars, connections and supports. He had to be placed in position behind a screen, and where necessary would forbid sales of tickets to a particular theatre gallery to prevent the audience from seeing any iron bars or supports protruding behind him. By 1835 he had omitted some of the singing from his act and worked up the illusion as a climax. He developed it so that he could juggle with golden balls at the same time.

=== Robert-Houdin ===
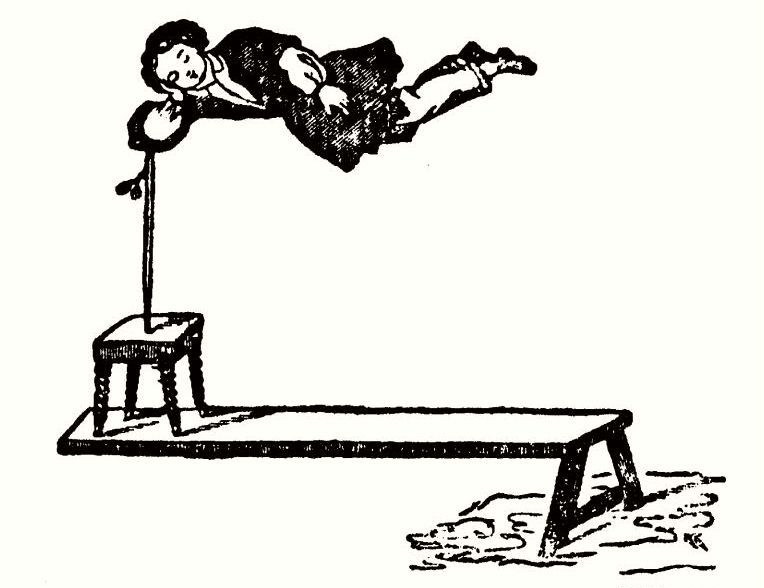
Robert-Houdin's ethereal suspension

In Robert Houdin's version, known as ethereal suspension, he appeared to administer ether to an assistant who was then shown to balance horizontally in the air with an apparently inadequate support at the shoulder only. Robert-Houdin asserted that he was the first to perform this type of illusion in 1849, but this was later discredited by Harry Houdini.

== Later performers ==
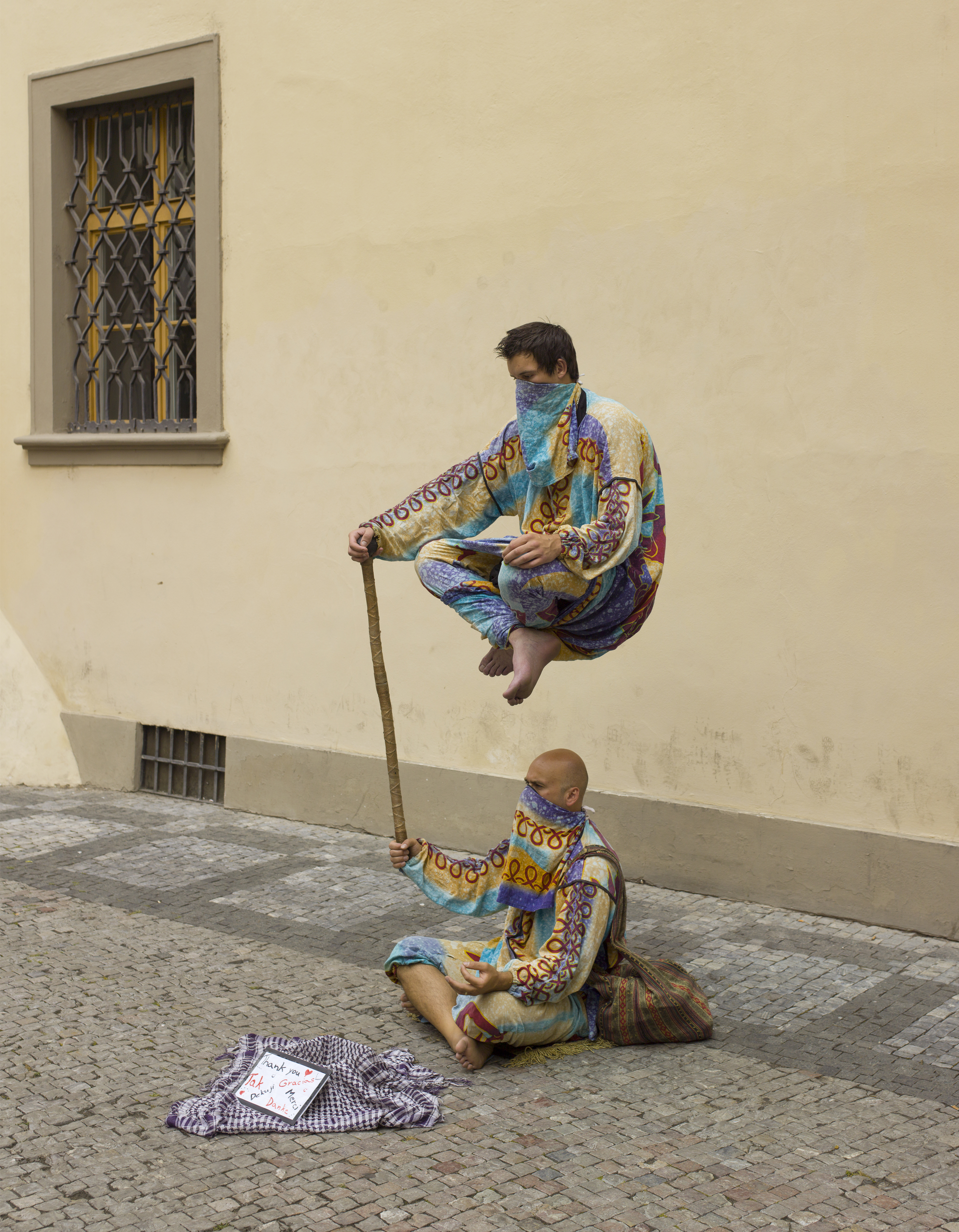
Modern street performers in Prague, 2013

In the 1870s and 1880s, Alexander Herrmann (1844–1896) and his wife Adelaide performed an adaptation of aerial suspension which they called Trilby. P. C. Sorcar (1913–1971) performed a Floating Lady routine featuring aerial suspension in 1964.

== Bibliography ==
- During, Simon (2004). Modern Enchantments: The Cultural Power of Secular Magic. London: Harvard University Press. ISBN 9780674013711.
- Frost, Thomas (1876). The Lives of the Conjurers. London: Tinsley Brothers. pp. 221–222.
- Houdini, Harry (1908). The Unmasking of Robert-Houdin. New York: Publishers Printing Co. pp. 230–232.
- Waters, T.A. (1988). The Encyclopedia of Magic and Magicians. Facts on File. ISBN 9780816013494.
