= Alexander Herrmann =

French magician (1844–1896)

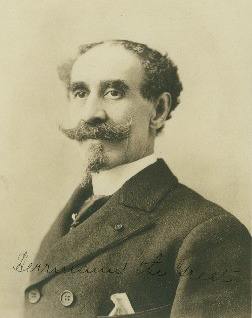
- Herrmann the Great
- Born: February 10, 1844; Paris, France
- Died: December 17, 1896 (aged 52); Ellicottville, New York, U.S.
- Occupations: Magician, illusionist

Alexander Herrmann (February 10, 1844 – December 17, 1896), better known as Herrmann the Great, was a 19th-century French magician. His wife, Adelaide Herrmann, was famously known as the "Queen of Magic."

== Early years ==
Alexander Herrmann was born in Paris, France, the youngest of sixteen children to Samuel Herrmann, a German Jew, and Anna Sarah (Meyer) Herrmann, of Breton descent (although she may in fact have been born in Hamburg, Germany).

== Samuel Herrmann ==
According to the Herrmann family lore, Samuel Herrmann was a part-time magician and full-time physician. Samuel Herrmann was a favorite of the Sultan of Turkey, who sent for the magician often. The Sultan paid a princely sum for the entertainment. It has been said that he was receiving so much attention from the elite of Paris with his magic shows, that word spread to Napoleon himself, who wanted Samuel to perform for him. Napoleon reportedly gave Samuel a gold watch for his performance. Alexander Herrmann was carrying the gold watch on the day of his death. It was passed on to his widow. Eventually Samuel's practice as a physician demanded more of his time so he quit magic entirely.

With the birth of his eldest son, Compars, in 1816 in Hanover, Germany, he decided to settle down to continue his practice. Samuel Herrmann played small towns around from 1817 in Germany and moved his family to France. He played the institutes and lyceums of Paris and gave performances until 1855. He taught his skills to his oldest son Compars, also known as Carl. He played in colleges in Paris and Versailles. Samuel entertained the pupils of the grandes écoles near Versailles. With this performance, his son Carl was admitted to the school tuition-free. Samuel Herrmann continued even after his son Carl succeeded him as a magician. Samuel retired about 1860.

== Compars "Carl" Herrmann ==
Alexander's brother Compars Herrmann left medical school at an early age to pursue a career as a magician and served as a role model and inspiration for Alexander. When Compars (also known as Carl) returned to his parents' home in Paris in 1853, he was thrilled to find out that his eight-year-old brother Alexander was already showing an interest in magic. Without his family's consent, Carl 'kidnapped' his younger brother and took him to Saint Petersburg, Russia to teach him the art of magic. While there, he took his younger brother with him on a tour that started in Russia.

Alexander remained with Carl until they arrived in Vienna. Their mother came there and insisted upon Alexander's return to Paris. They eventually reached a compromise; Alexander stayed with Carl until the tour was over. Alexander's duties consisted of being suspended in a horizontal position on top of a rod, performing as a blindfolded medium, and being lifted from an empty portfolio. During their European excursion, Carl was teaching Alexander advanced sleight of hand techniques, some of which he had learned from their father, others of which he had picked up on his own.

Alexander was an eager and willing student. After touring places like Germany, Austria, Italy, and Portugal, the tour ended in Vienna. Carl settled in Vienna and, as promised, he sent Alexander home to their parents in Paris. Back in Paris, Alexander showed his father what he had learned from Carl. Samuel was so impressed with Alexander's skill that he decided to let him continue in magic. Alexander stayed in Paris until he was about 11 years old; then he returned to Vienna to meet up with Carl, who was to continue mentoring him. Carl had promised Samuel to teach Alexander things other than magic, and while in Vienna Alexander attended college. But it was sleight of hand that was to be his main interest.

== Carl mentors Alexander ==
Alexander accompanied Carl on nearly every tour. At first he returned to his role as assistant. This time, though, he did not float on a horizontal pole. Carl discarded the equipment from his last tour when French magician Robert-Houdin claimed they were his tricks. Robert-Houdin had his trusted mechanic Le Grand arrested for making and selling duplicate illusions. It is not known whether Carl bought the illusions directly from LeGrand or from another source. What is known is that he discarded them in favor of tricks using pure sleight of hand.

When Alexander's skills increased, he became a more integral part of Carl's show. By the time they arrived in the United States in 1860, Alexander was seventeen. Audiences noticed his adroitness; his dexterity soon rivaled that of his famous brother. Jealousy brewed on that tour, but never surfaced.

They appeared at the Academy of Music in Brooklyn during its inaugural season. The Academy of Music was known as a center for progressive and avant-garde performances. They generally presented operas, but when the two Herrmanns arrived, the music played second fiddle to the brothers' magic. The posters of the time mentioned that Herrmann's "distinguishing feature is the entire absence of any apparatus, all effects being solely produced by extraordinary manual skill." They still performed Houdin's "Second Sight" as Alexander assisted Carl on stage. Carl introduced Alexander to the audience as his successor. Then Alexander performed a "card scaling" (card-throwing) act.

Card-throwing finds its origins in Western stage magic. Western card-throwing techniques, as they are passed among performers today, are attributed to stage magicians in the late 19th century. The exact origins of "flying card" tricks are unknown, but Alexander is usually credited with first including card throwing in a major act. Alexander become so skilled that he could place a card in the lap of any spectator that raised their hand. He could also bounce cards off of the rear wall of the largest theatres. He developed a technique that is still copied today which allowed him to be able to scale the cards all the way to the back of the theater. This, of course, made a big impact on the people in the cheaper seats.

Five weeks of full houses brought Carl receipts totaling $35,000 ($1,130,000 in 2025 dollars). When the American Civil War broke out, the Herrmanns left the United States for Central and South America.

A few years later, they parted company. Alexander appeared on his own until he met up with Carl in Vienna in 1867. They formed their second co-partnership and returned to the U.S. to resume their tour there. According to Walter B. Gibson's book The Magic Masters, they "implanted the name Herrmann quite firmly there." The Herrmann name eventually became synonymous with magic. Eventually the two magic brothers would go their separate ways.

== Career ==
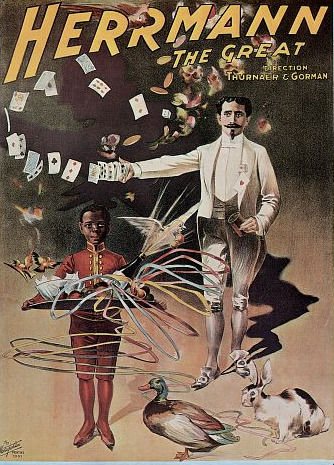
Theatrical poster for a Leon "Herrmann the Great" stage show

With the departure of Carl, Alexander began his independent career in 1862. Carl returned to play to the capitals of Europe. Alexander brought his own show to London in 1871 and began a three-year stretch at Egyptian Hall, which he called his "one thousand and one nights". Egyptian Hall was one of the first buildings in England to be influenced by the Egyptian style, inspired by Europe's new interest in the various temples on the Nile, the Pyramids and the Sphinx. By the end of the 19th century, the Hall was also associated with magic and spiritualism, as a number of performers and lecturers had hired it for shows. So when Alexander began his run there, it was already the hallmark of a professional magician's career.

As he got older, he came to resemble his brother Carl. Carl wore an imperial beard and handlebar moustache, and his hair was thinning. Alexander had a full set of curly hair, a thick goatee and a moustache with upturned ends. Even though they resembled each other, Alexander developed his own distinct, magnetic personality. Carl's humor was sly and he presented his magic in a mysterious manner; he was from the old school of magic. Alexander's performance style, on the other hand, was to interweave comedy with his magic. He was a humorist who aimed to make his performances a joyous occasion.

Herrmann's philosophy about performing magic was that "the magician depends for the success of his art upon the credulity of the people. Whatever mystifies, excites curiosity; whatever in turn baffles this curiosity, works the marvelous."

Despite his performances' humorous elements, Alexander still mystified his audiences. His intense eyes, imposing mustache and goatee gave him a satanic appearance; in person he looked like a magician. According to H. J. Burlingame, Alexander Herrmann's personality presented "an atmosphere of mystery about the magician." Burlingame also noted that Herrmann was one of the kindest and gentlest of men.

Rumors emerged that Carl was Alexander's uncle, or that they were not related. A lawsuit claimed that Alexander's real name was Nieman. It went on to say that Carl adopted young Nieman and used him as an assistant so he could groom him to become his successor. The suit claimed that Nieman had adopted the name Herrmann. In 1895, Alexander printed a statement to a San Francisco newspaper that contradicted everything in the lawsuit. He told the newspaper that he had been born in France on February 11, 1843, of German parentage. (His date of birth given here contradicts records that show that he was born February 10, 1844, according to Herrmann expert James Hamilton). He stated that his father was a physician in Germany and had moved to Paris before Alexander was born. Nevertheless, the rumors persisted even after his death; Alexander's widow had to disprove them many times.

Carl retired during Alexander's three-year stint at Egyptian Hall. While in America, Alexander had learned the value of making the press; he used that ability during his run in London. While strolling down Regent Street with a friend, he gathered a crowd. He stepped up to two gentlemen and picked a handkerchief from one. He did this clumsily to get the attention of two policemen that were behind him. As the two bobbies came towards him, Alexander deftly poached the watch of the second gentleman.

Alexander's friend offered to vouch for him. As he was telling the virtues of his friend, the second man discovered that his watch was missing. He insisted that Herrmann took it. Alexander professed his innocence and asked the policemen to search him. They did not find the stolen items. Herrmann suggested that the two policemen should search themselves. The handkerchief was found on one of the cops, the missing pocket watch was on the other. Then one of the policemen noticed his badge missing. They searched one of the gentlemen and found the missing badge. Herrmann smiled and said, "It seems that I am the only honest person here."

He tried in vain to explain to the police that the entire thing was just a magician's joke. "We will not be deceived in that way," the second cop said. So they hauled him off to the police station. There he was recognized and set free. The London papers got hold of the story and made it a sensation. The entire town was laughing at the practical joke Herrmann had played on London's finest.

Herrmann had an outgoing personality and had no problem making friends. Not only did men find him sociable, but ladies took fancy to him. One in particular was a 22-year-old dancer from London by the name of Adelaide Scarcez. Most of his acquaintances were from the theatrical world.

Alexander's record-breaking run would soon end. He was set to tour Europe after his triumph at Egyptian Hall. Then he returned to the United States and Canada and made several tours. Meanwhile, the financial panic of 1873 wiped out his brother Carl. On May 9, the Vienna Stock Exchange (Wiener Börse) crashed. They no longer were able to bankroll the corrupt mismanagement of the Deutsche Bank. A series of Viennese bank failures resulted. This caused a deflation of the money available for business lending. (See Panic of 1873.)

Carl needed money and the only way to pay his debts was to return to performing.

== Marriage and American naturalization ==
Meanwhile, in 1874, Alexander returned to America. On the boat, he saw the young dancer Mademoiselle Scarcez that he had met in London. The titian-haired, bilingual Adelaide had been planning to marry an American actor. Before the ship docked, she changed her mind.

In Manhattan on March 27, 1875, the Mayor of New York performed the ceremony marrying Alexander and Adelaide. Herrmann was known to do spontaneous tricks. Even on his wedding day he could not resist; he produced a roll of bills from the mayor's beard.

Sometimes his gags backfired on him. He was once having dinner with newspaper journalist and humorist Bill Nye (aka Edgar Wilson Nye). Herrmann found a large diamond in the lettuce of Nye's salad. Nye turned the tables on the great magician. He picked up the diamond and handed it to a passing waitress—"as a little present," Nye said. Herrmann had trouble getting his diamond back from the waitress. The girl refused to give it up. The proprietor of the restaurant had to apply pressure on her.

In New York, he wanted to purchase a home, but only a citizen of America could buy a home. So he became a naturalized citizen in July 1876 in Boston. Later, he bought a dark red mansion in Whitestone, Queens in New York. An eight-foot-high, spiked wire fence enclosed the property. A herd of cattle and several goats grazing in the pasture could be seen along the winding, tree-lined road.

When friends would visit from Europe, he would pick them up in his yacht, Fra Diavolo, which he moored in Long Island Sound. He also had his private rail car waiting at the Whitestone Depot, along with two baggage cars that carried his equipment. The private car cost him $40,000 (about $800,000 in today's figures).

== A typical Herrmann show ==
As Alexander's brother Carl got older, he reduced the size of his show. Alexander increased the size of his. The following is a description of a typical Herrmann show as seen through the eyes of a spectator.

After much fanfare from the orchestra, Herrmann entered. He was decked out in black velvet evening clothes with britches. He wore the typical top hat of the day and white gloves. The audience applauded; he bowed and smiled.

He took off his gloves and made them vanish between his hands. Herrmann presented two metal cones and a beautifully decorated brass vase. He opened the lid on the vase and showed a bag of rice. All items were examined by spectators.

Upon return of the items, Herrmann poured the rice into the vase and placed the lid on it. He went into the audience, walked over to a bearded gentleman and borrowed his hat. He reached over to the gentleman's beard and produced an orange from it—"Thank you. Just what I needed for this trick"—eliciting a chuckle from the audience. He returned to the stage and placed the hat on a chair and the orange on one of the tables.

Herrmann asked the audience which cone they would like, "The right one or the left?" He took the selected cone and placed it upon the hat. "I will cause the rice and orange to switch places".

After much by-play where he pretended to sneak the orange away from the cone, he decided not to use the cone at all. He left the cone on the empty hat and placed the orange on the table. After making a magical pass, he lifted up the cone and a pile of rice appeared on the crown of the hat. He picked up the orange and made it disappear in his hands. Then he lifted up the vase that contained the rice and showed the missing orange.

From there, he would casually show his hands to be empty and produce a fan of cards from behind his knee. With the produced cards, he would go into a series of sleight of hand tricks. He concluded the card act with three people from the audience selecting cards. He placed the pack into a goblet. From the goblet, the selected cards would rise one by one. He would take the pack out of the goblet and toss them, and they would melt in mid-air.

He'd pretend that he was done with cards, but his empty hands were soon filled with them. He'd take each one and scale them into the audience. Herrmann would ask an audience member to call out for one and he'd accurately toss it to him, sometimes as far as the topmost row in the gallery.

Herrmann then picked up the silk top hat that he had borrowed from an audience member. One by one, he would produce a number of silver dollars from the air. After the shining coin hit the glare of the spotlight, he would toss it into the hat with a definite clink sound. He would produce a large number of dollars until the hat was full. Herrmann poured the coins into a silver tray and showed it to the audience. From there, the coins were dumped into a paper bag. He'd wrap it up and toss it to the owner of the hat. The silver dollars had changed into a box of candy.

A piece of paper was left over from the package. Herrmann picked this up and rolled it into a ball. Then he proceeded to knock it through his knee. In an instant he tossed the ball of paper into the air, where it vanished.

Herrmann picked up the hat and discovered many things inside—enough to fill a trunk. He thanked the owner of the hat as he returned it. As he did, he found a white rabbit inside of it. Herrmann stroked the rabbit. He pulled it apart and had two rabbits, one in each hand. He put the rabbits on the table. "If you notice," he said in his Parisian accent, "the rabbits are the same size, no?" He scooped them from the table and they melted into one.

"Now, you notice that the rabbit, she is much fatter". He picked up a pistol from the table. He tossed the rabbit into the air and shot at it. The rabbit was gone. He quickly went down to the runway into the audience. He pulled the vanished rabbit from the coattails of a spectator.

As he walked back to the stage, the curtain closed behind him. He stood in front of the curtain and cradled the rabbit like a baby. He proceeded to talk to the rabbit. Apparently the rabbit did not understand broken French because the rabbit turned its head toward Herrmann and cocked up one ear. This caused the audience to laugh and applaud.

The orchestra picked up the pace of the music and Herrmann exited. Madame Herrmann entered, performing a fire dance. Alexander Herrmann caught his breath and the rest of the show continued.

To achieve most of his tricks in the first act, Herrmann would rely on what is referred to in magic as "body loads", one of the seven principles of sleight of hand. Herrmann carried his loads on his body and inside his coat, placing them where he needed them.

One summer evening, Herrmann was sitting backstage in his dressing room after packing his jacket. He had draped the tailcoat over his chair. He was talking to the theatre manager, who also had his evening jacket off. When the first bell rang for the beginning of the show to start, the manager got up, put on his coat, and left.

Herrmann put on his coat and gloves as he walked towards the stage. The music played his march and he entered stage right.

He took his bow and went into his opening act. He took off his gloves in preparation to make them disappear when he realized that something was wrong: he wasn't wearing his coat. Without his coat, he could not go on with the first act. Instead of panicking, he set his gloves aside and picked up a pack of cards that was on the table.

He did some elegant card flourishes with them. As he was closing with some fancy cuts, he was wondering about his coat. Suddenly he had the answer. The theatre manager was also wearing a full dress suit. He must have taken Herrmann's coat. He gave the deck a final flourish. He snapped his fingers to the wings. One of his assistants came on stage. Herrmann was flinging cards out to the audience. He leaned over to the assistant and whispered, "Find the manager. He's wearing my coat." He flung a few cards until half of the pack was left. He added, "And bring me more cards." The assistant left.

Herrmann took the next card and gripped it between the first and second finger of his left hand. Then he flicked his wrist, sailing the card into the audience. He then scaled two or three more cards in quick succession into the audience. His assistant came back with a few more cards. He told Herrmann that he had sent someone to look for the manager. Herrmann took the cards and scaled those. He told his assistant to bring on more cards.

The audience was waving for them. So he flung them quickly one after another. He flung a few at the balcony into the hands of a waiting spectator. More cards were brought on. News was relayed to him that they were still trying to find the manager. Herrmann scaled cards to the farthest reaches of the gallery gaining critical acclaim for doing such.

He was down to a few cards. He was exhausted and didn't know what else to do to stall. He looked over at the wings and saw the surprised manager. Herrmann scaled his last card and bowed. The applause was deafening.

He went offstage and quickly removed the manager's jacket. Then he carefully pulled off his own from the startled manager. Herrmann checked the contents. Everything was still in its place. He carefully put on his coat and smoothed it up. He strode on stage as before. He bowed as the applause crescendoed again. He then went into his original routine.

== Herrmann the Great ==
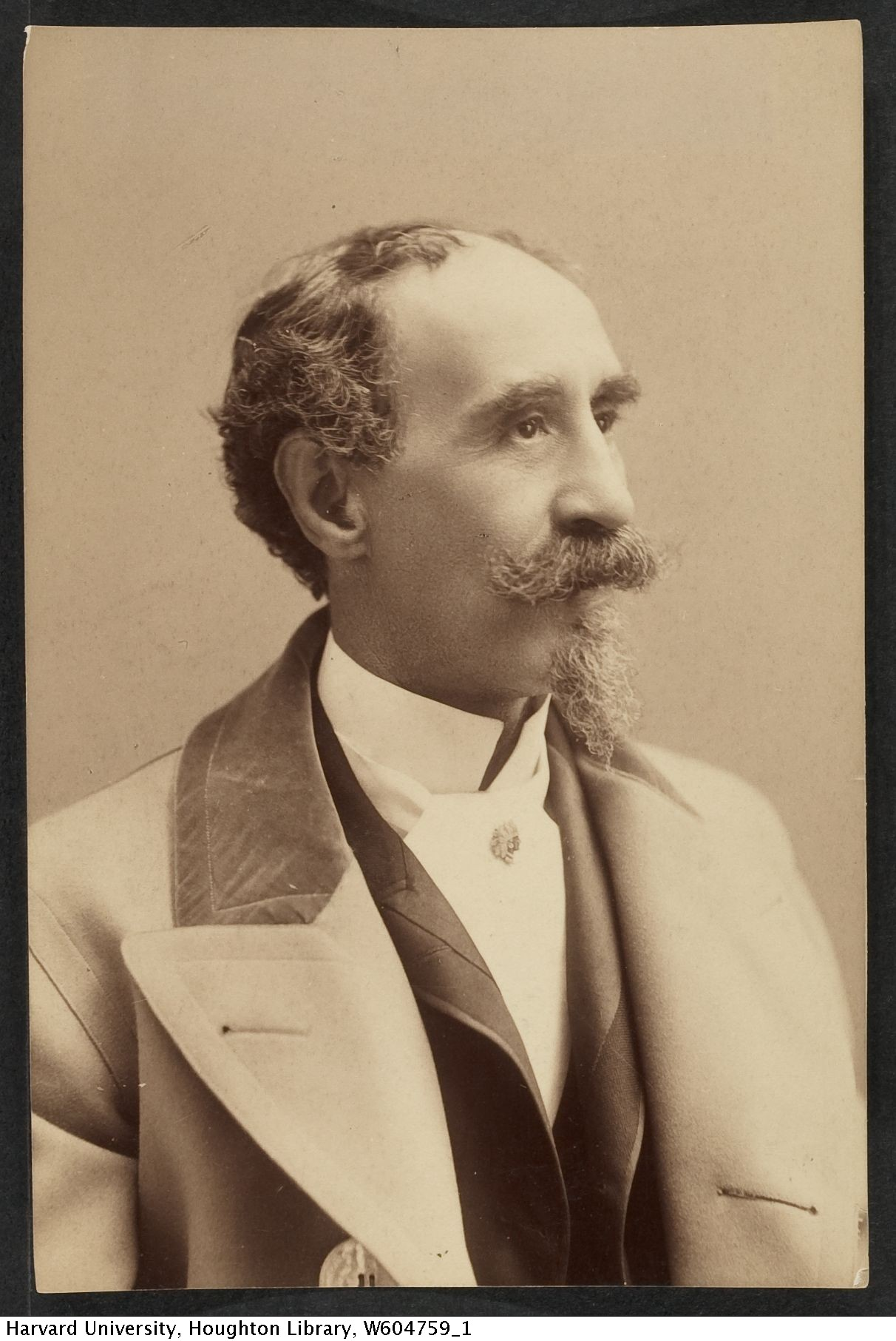
Herrmann the Great

In 1883, after solidifying his name in the United States, Herrmann embarked on another world tour. His first stop was South America. Emperor Don Pedro II of Brazil attended nineteen performances in Rio de Janeiro. The emperor was so fascinated with Herrmann's magic that he presented him with the Cross of Brazil.

After touring the rest of South America, Herrmann headed to Russia. His tour led him all the way to Siberia. In St. Petersburg, he received a grand reception. He was invited to a banquet for the Spanish minister, attended by various distinguished members of Russian society. They drank to his health: "From this moment forth, you will be known as Herrmann the Great."

The newly crowned Herrmann the Great gave a command performance for Czar Alexander III of Russia. The czar was impressed by Herrmann's delicate touch. He picked up a deck of cards and walked over to the wizard. He firmly grabbed the deck and tore it in half. He wanted to test Herrmann's mettle. He handed the torn deck to the magician to see if he could outmatch the czar's iron grip. Herrmann was always cool under fire. He only hesitated a moment as he proceeded with the challenge presented to him. He placed one half on top of the other and squared them neatly. Then he proceeded to tear both together. Czar Alexander was most impressed. He gave Herrmann a watch with a chain made of heavy twisted strands of gold.

Alexander tells an interesting tale of an incident that took place after the performance. He was playing billiards at the saloon with the attaché of the court when he noticed the Czar was also playing there. Herrmann shot the ball with all of his strength against a plate-glass mirror that extended from the floor to the ceiling. It shattered into fifty pieces. Every person in the room was horrified, none more than Herrmann.

The Czar brushed off Herrmann's apology and considered the destruction of the mirror trivial. He ordered the game to proceed. With the Czar's permission, Herrmann examined the mirror to estimate the damage done. He was hoping to have it repaired.

The Czar teased him, saying if he was such a good wizard why didn't he make the mirror whole? That was the very cue Herrmann was hoping for. He hesitated for an instant, then ordered the mirror to be covered with a cloth concealing it from view. After about ten minutes, he whisked away the cloth and the mirror was completely restored and without a flaw.

Herrmann later told The North American Review that he would leave it to the reader's imagination how it was done.

From Russia, Herrmann returned to the place of his birth, France. At the Eden Theatre in Paris, his performance was witnessed by the Prince and Princess of Wales (later to become King Edward VII and Queen Alexandra of England, aka Alexandra of Denmark).

Alexander met his brother Carl again in 1885 in Paris. Carl was still miffed at Alexander from his triumph at Egyptian Hall. Carl was planning on retiring again and was grooming their nephew Leon to be his successor. However, he did not intend to retire until he regained his fortune. So an agreement was made between the two brothers to split the world. Compars was to return to Europe and Alexander to the United States.

Alexander left Paris to go back to America, where he became an established institution. Two years later, while in New York, Alexander was shocked to hear the news of the death of his brother Carl, who died on July 8, 1887, in Karlsbad in Germany. Even with the rivalry between them, Alexander could not help but feel that he owed everything to him. "We've always had a warm and brotherly feeling towards each other," he told a newspaper.

Since Alexander was widely known in the States, when news of the death of Professor Herrmann hit the papers, many thought it was Alexander that had died. He was mourned in the papers.

Carl did regain his fortune before he died. Leon took his place and was doing well. Alexander was content to let Leon take over Europe.

Throughout the 1870s and 1880s, Alexander and his wife Adelaide Herrmann performed together in elaborate stage shows. The great American impresario Michael B. Leavitt handled Herrmann's American and Mexican contracts. Leavitt always paid all transportation costs as well as advertising, salaries, and other expenses. "Whenever I open a new theatre, " Leavitt once said, "I want to insure of large crowds, I will have Herrmann the Great play the date." He was always a drawing card wherever he played, receiving fifty percent of the gross receipt and earning $75,000 a year (about $3 million in today's figures).

He often squandered his money and would ask Leavitt to advance him $5,000 or more. Leavitt never refused his star. He considered it a safe investment. "The name Herrmann the Great on any marquee was a sure sign of a successful run."

Alexander and Adelaide lugged their show by railcar and kept their travels to the U.S. territories. They presented a full evening program, adapting such tricks as Robert Houdin's Ethereal suspension routine, otherwise known as aerial suspension, in an illusion called Trilby. A board would be set on top of two chairs, and Madame Herrmann would be placed on top of the board. Both the board and Madame Herrmann would rise into the air. The two chairs would be removed. After a hoop was passed over, Madame Herrmann would descend back to the two chairs.

The Herrmanns presented this and many other fine illusions of the time. Their only rival was Harry Kellar.

== Paper wars ==
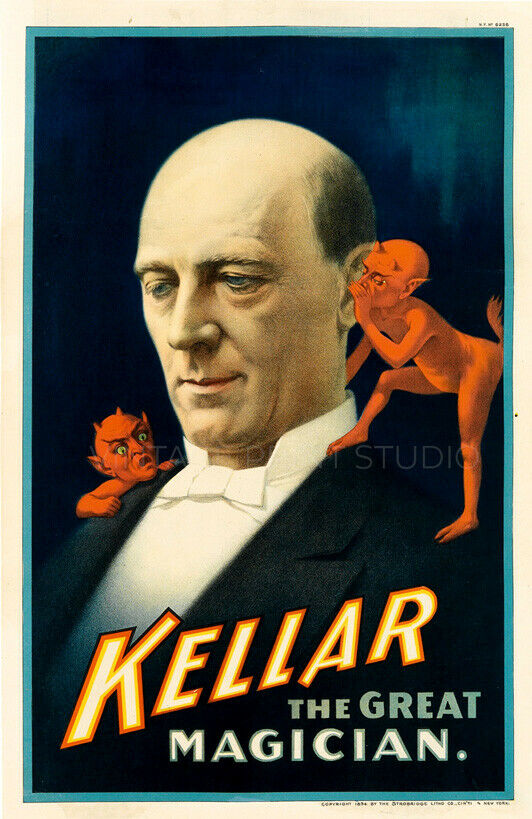
Harry Kellar's famous advertisements often portrayed supernatural creatures.

During the Golden Age of Magic, America only allowed one King of Magic at a time. Robert Heller was the first to wear the mantle. After his death, Harry Kellar tried to follow him, but because of the similarities between their names, it was wrongly assumed that he had adjusted his name to take advantage of the dead magician's fame. Even though he tried to prove that his original name was Keller with an e and changed years ago so not to be confused with his friend Heller, the public was still cold to him.

So Kellar toured the world instead, only making occasional trips to his home country. When he did, he found the new King of Magic was Herrmann the Great. He tried to dethrone the reigning monarch, but the America people loved Alexander and his wit.

Herrmann knew Kellar wasn't serious competition, but he was condescending toward him nonetheless. He was judgmental of Kellar's lack of sleight of hand skills and his preference for using mechanical methods. Even on such favorites as the Miser's Dream, Kellar chose to use a secret device he had created.

Kellar's misdirection was excellent in tricks like the Flower Growth. Two flower pots were covered by a cone and a full bouquet of flowers were produced by Kellar as if they had grown magically. No false moves were ever detected by the audience. Herrmann too was a master at misdirection, and as a pure entertainer, he had no equal.

Leavitt handled both magicians. There was never any problem until 1888 when Kellar learned of Herrmann's proposed tour of Mexico. Kellar asked Leavitt to cancel his American tour so he could play the Mexican tour before Herrmann's arrival date. At first Leavitt objected, but Kellar had a strong personality and would not take no for an answer. Leavitt regretfully conceded. However, instead of letting Kellar win, he used Herrmann as a spoiler.

When Herrmann returned to the United States, he presented his expenses to Leavitt as usual. This time he refused to pay them. He claimed that much of the expense for transportation costs was for sending antique furniture and other curios back to Herrmann's home in Long Island. A litigation ensued which strained their relations.

Whenever Herrmann or Kellar would play a town, they would hang paper banners heralding their arrival. Whoever got there first won that battle. So they started a succession of paper wars. Herrmann would put up his posters. Then Kellar's people would follow along and put up Kellar's posters. Herrmann's people would follow suit and cover Kellar's, making a third layer. This would continue until the day of the show; the last poster standing was the victor.

After years of this bickering, they decided to hold a ceasefire. They felt the country was big enough to have two Kings of Magic. Even with this truce, the public still favored Alexander.

== The bullet catch ==
One of the most dangerous magic tricks is the bullet catch. The bullet catch is a trick in which a magician has a spectator mark a bullet and load it into a gun. Then the spectator fires directly at the magician, who appears to catch the bullet—often in his mouth, sometimes in his hand. In their patter, magicians often refer to the legend of 12 magicians that have died doing the trick. ("Will I be number 13?") Even though most things magicians utter is hyperbole, there is real danger associated with the bullet catch.

A version of the act was designed by Herrmann the Great with the help of his assistant, Billy Robinson. (Years later, Billy, as Chung Ling Soo, would be killed with the same style gun.)

Old fashioned muzzle-loaders were used for the act. The so-called bullet was actually a lead ball rammed into the gun together with a small charge of gunpowder. When the firing mechanism was activated, the gunpowder exploded and caused the lead ball to project forward down the barrel like a miniature cannon shot. In truth, most versions of the trick had either a fake bullet inserted into the gun, or had the ball secretly removed immediately before discharge. What came out the gun's muzzle was just a flash of fire, giving the illusion of an exiting projectile.

Herrmann the Great performed his own version of the bullet catch. The bullet was still marked, but the danger of the trick was avoided. The gunpowder never came near the firing mechanism, with the result that the bullet never left the gun. The trick was safe—or so Herrmann thought; he would never live long enough to see his one-time assistant die from it.

However, he did make the most of the trick. Not a normal part of his act, the trick would be presented on special occasions. Herrmann announced in May 1896 that he would attempt the bullet catch for the seventh time on the stage of the Olympia Theatre as part of a fundraiser for the Sick Babies Fund.

A female reporter was dispatched to interview Madame Herrmann. She went to the Herrmann Manor at Whitestone Landing for the interview. As she walked in she was greeted with a voice that said, "What do you want?" She turned around and saw a black bird sitting on a perch. Just then an animated skeleton sprung out at her. She shrieked, which brought a maid from down the hall. She found the Herrmanns waiting for her.

Madame Herrmann said, "I lock myself into my dressing room whenever Alexander faces a firing squad".

"Nonsense", Herrmann the Great said: "I have already caught bullets successfully six times. Seven, you know, is a lucky number". He mentioned that he had applied for a life insurance plan with Connecticut Indemnity Association, but that the plan would not be in effect for the trick. Apparently he had not mentioned the bullet-catching stunt when he applied for it.

On the day of the performance, Herrmann looked somber. He wore a white shirt with frills on the sleeves. He had five muzzle loaders marked and loaded. They aimed their rifles at him. Madame Herrmann was nowhere to be seen. Herrmann held a china plate in front of him like a target. When he gave the orders, the gun was fired and he caught the bullets on the plate. Calmly he handed the bullets out for examination; they appeared to be the very same bullets.

In 1885, Herrmann returned to America, receiving the best terms given to any star on the road. He lost a lot of money to outside investments. For the upcoming season, he estimated he would make $85,000 to $95,000 profit ($3.68 million in 2025).

== Death ==
Herrmann the Great was a generous person despite his Mephistophelean appearance. He was the first magician to perform at Sing Sing prison. He also lost a large amount of money helping other actors who invested in bad theatrical venues. When the manager of the Chicago Opera House needed three thousand dollars, he met the debt by sending him a check.

On December 16, 1896, Herrmann was finishing a week engagement at the Lyceum in Rochester, New York. He invited an entire school to his matinee performance. That afternoon, the house was packed. Because the throng was so enthusiastic and gave him many ovations, Herrmann extended the length of the performance.

Between shows, an agent pleaded with him to meet the overdue hotel bills of a theatrical company that was stranded in Rochester. Herrmann was moved by this request. Then the agent asked to buy railway tickets for them. Herrmann paid for their train tickets to Manhattan and paid their expenses. He also invited them to his evening show before they left.

After the show, he was the guest of honor at a banquet given by the Genesee Valley Club. The group from the party was to occupy his special train for Bradford, Pennsylvania, which was to leave early in the morning. The festivities lasted until after midnight. He performed for the group, doing card tricks and telling amusing stories about his adventures around the world. "My nephew Leon, who is in Paris, will be my successor when I retire."

The next day, he located the train and waved goodbye to his friends who had ridden with him from his private carriage to the railroad station. One of them was a young drama critic of the Rochester newspaper. His name was John Northern Hilliard. (Hilliard later became America's foremost author on magic.) The trip would be three hours.

While on board a train to the next performance, Herrmann suffered a heart attack. The train stopped in Ellicottville, New York. Alexander whispered to Adelaide, "Make sure all in the company get back to New York." The local doctor arrived a few moments later, but it was too late. He failed to recover. On December 17, 1896, at the age of 52, Herrmann the Great was pronounced dead.

The obituary that announced his death was the most extensive ever for a magician. Herrmann's body was taken to New York for burial services, and thousands attended and tried unsuccessfully to approach to the coffin. Herrmann is interred in Woodlawn Cemetery in The Bronx, New York City.

== Legacy ==
After Herrmann died in 1896, his widow Adelaide continued performing her husband's illusions. On January 11, 1897, she was joined by Alexander's nephew, Leon Herrmann. The Herrmann name still drew crowds, but because of clashes of temperament, Leon and Adelaide parted company after three seasons and continued separate acts.

Leon's show failed to draw audiences, and this decline led to Kellar taking over the mantle of the leading magician in America. Leon later trimmed his show to a short vaudeville act. While on a holiday trip to Paris, Leon died on May 16, 1909.

In contrast, Adelaide Herrmann continued to perform as a successful solo magician for the next 25 years, and became known as "The Queen of Magic". Notably, she continued to perform the dangerous bullet catch trick. Adelaide retired at the age of 75. She died in 1932, and is buried at Woodlawn Cemetery next to her husband.

== In popular culture ==
In 2022, the Herrmanns were the subject of the song "Herrmann the Great" by independent singer-songwriter Dan Zappulla.
