= Bartolomeo Bosco =

Italian magician

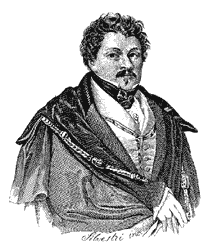
- Born: Giovanni Bartolomeo Bosco; January 3, 1793; Turin, Italy
- Died: March 7, 1863 (aged 70); Dresden, Germany
- Occupation: Magician

Giovanni Bartolomeo Bosco (January 3, 1793 – March 7, 1863) was an Italian magician during the mid-19th century. He is best known for his adroitness with the famous cups and balls.

When he was nineteen years old, he was drafted into Napoleon's Army. In 1812, Bosco was wounded during the Battle of Borodino by a Cossack lancer. He pretended to be dead as he noticed someone searching the dead bodies for loot. The looter went through Bosco's things while at the same time Bosco picked the looter's pocket. Bosco was taken prisoner in Siberia and entertained the other prisoners and the guards with his magic.

After the war, he returned home to Turin in 1814, and studied medicine for a short time. Bosco went on to perform his magic for the ruler of the Russian Empire as well as the heads of state of Prussia, Sweden, and France. Bosco later set up a theatre in Paris. Jean-Eugène Robert-Houdin admired Bosco's skills with cups and balls, but was disgusted with Bosco's tricks involving live animals, which were killed during the performance.

== Literature ==
- Natias Neutert: "Bottoms Up!" in: Genii, March 1993.
- Alex Rusconi, Bartolomeo Bosco. Vita e meraviglie del mago che conquistò l'Europa, Florence Art Edizioni, 2017. ISBN 9788899112455
