= Ching Lau Lauro =

British magician (1806/08 – 1840)

- Born: Possibly Lauro Cecconi. (Note: Lauto Cecconi: See discussion on talkpage.); 1806–1808; Possibly Venice, Italy.
- Died: Possibly 1892, or January 1840. Possibly Portsea, Hampshire, or London.
- Other names: Ching Lau Lauro; Professor Ching
- Occupation: Magic (illusion)
- Years active: 1827–1839
- Known for: Possibly first in Europe to perform using limelight; First in Europe to perform aerial suspension illusion.

Ching Lau Lauro and Professor Ching were the stage names of a juggler and magician (1806?–1840; flourished 1827–1839) who performed outdoors and in theatres in London and the provinces. His real name is unknown; he was possibly Italian and he was popularly known as Ching. He was the first magician in Europe to perform the aerial suspension illusion, possibly the first to use limelight, and one of the earliest Western magicians to perform in Chinese costume.

== Background ==
=== Origins and identity ===
Little is known about the early life of the performer known as Ching Lau Lauro and his real name is unknown. He was possibly born around 1806 or even a little later, although his short career spanned 1827 to 1839. (Note: The evidence which suggests that Ching was a fairly young performer is that he was able to perform extreme bodily contortions as part of his act throughout his career. This ability tends to be limited to youths and young adults. The same evidence would also suggest that he is unlikely to have had a previous career under a different stage name.) His stage name was Ching Lau Lauro. He was also known as Professor Ching, and popularly referred to as Ching. He was not Chinese, and although a Cornish background has been suggested, no evidence has been given for that. His advertisements included an act called "imitation of a Chinese juggler" and he was one of the earliest Western magicians to dress as a Chinese man. In an early entertainment bill of 1827 he is promoted as a "primo buffo from Venice;" however, the misspelling on that playbill of "Lau" as "Law" might indicate an anglicised pronunciation of the name. Ching shared some characteristics with Lauro Cecconi, a bandmaster of the Carabiniers (6th Dragoon Guards) who was born in Venice around 1907. (Note: Lauro Cecconi (c.1907–1892). See discussion on talk page.) He was described as a "well-proportioned person." (Note: "Well proportioned person" would suggest a good height and athletic build, since these represented prosperity and male attractiveness at that time.)

=== Possible circus background ===
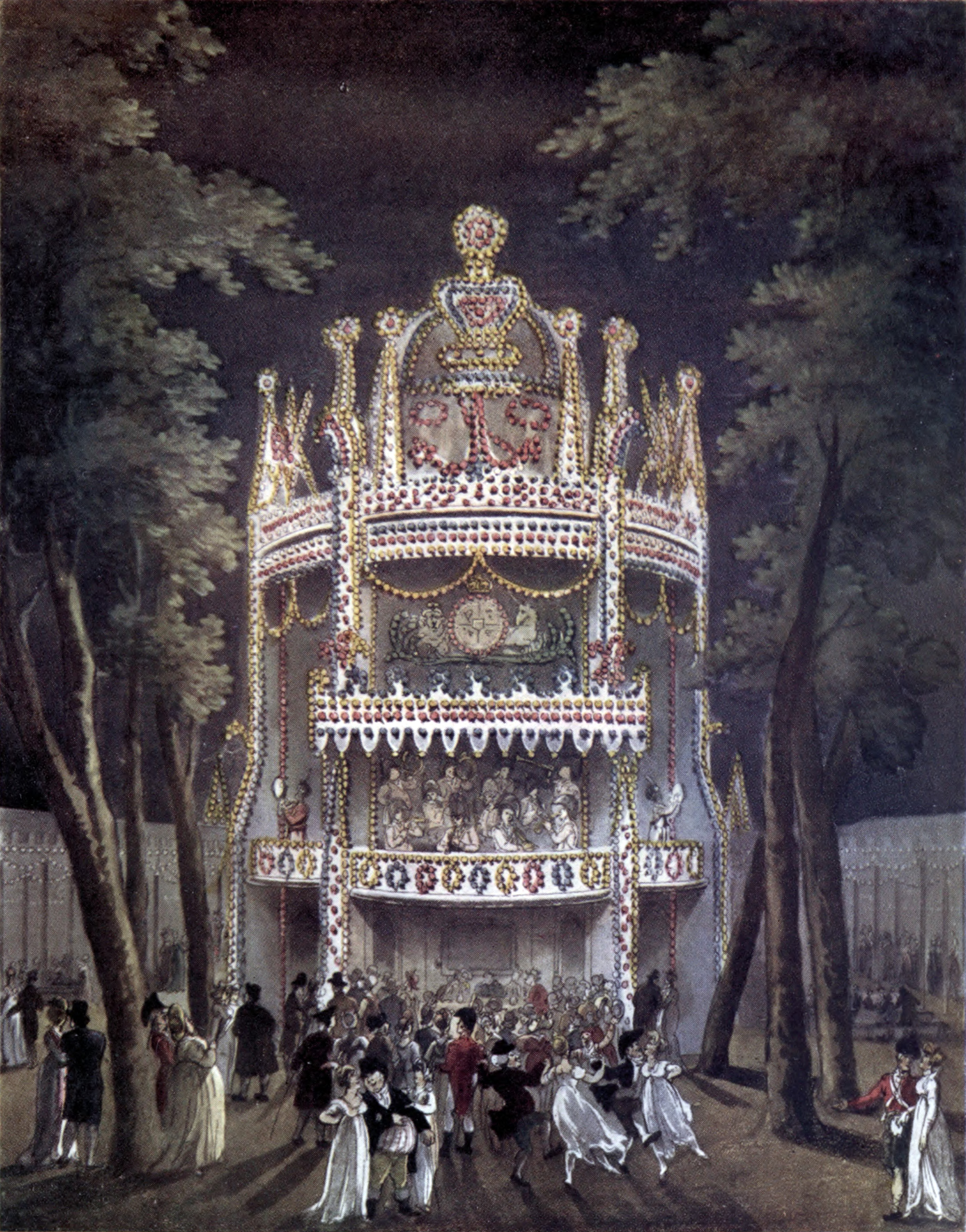
Vauxhall Gardens where he performed in 1827

It is possible that Ching's particular entertainment skills might indicate that his background was among Cornish travelling showpeople who travelled and performed at circuses and fairs between March and November. Some had winter quarters in Cornwall, and some, like Ching Lau Lauro, might have been fortunate enough to perform indoors in the winter. However there is no evidence of that background. The fact that he performed "postures, equilibriums, evolutions and attitudes" in the character of a Buffo at Vauxhall Gardens in 1827, 1828 and 1834 might support several theories about his background, since many of the Vauxhall performers were from a circus background, or were Italian or Chinese.

=== Private life ===
In September 1839, a William Creaser (18), alias 'Ching Lauro', was arrested for robbery. Creaser was so named as he was supposedly once a servant of the conjuror. He was detained until the Spring Assizes, sentenced to 12 months prison, and died of inflammation of the lungs on 8 November 1840.

The conjuror himself was said to have died in London sometime between 19 and 26 January 1840, not long after his last performance. (Note: Since Ching's performances required extreme gymnastic ability and contortions, he is unlikely to have been an old man when he died.) His brief obituary under his stage name, copied verbatim in several newspapers, describes him as "the celebrated conjuror". He made good money and was also sometimes a philanthropist: in 1834 he donated £4 8s 6d, the proceeds of a single day's performance, to the York Dispensary which gave medicines to the poor.

== Career ==
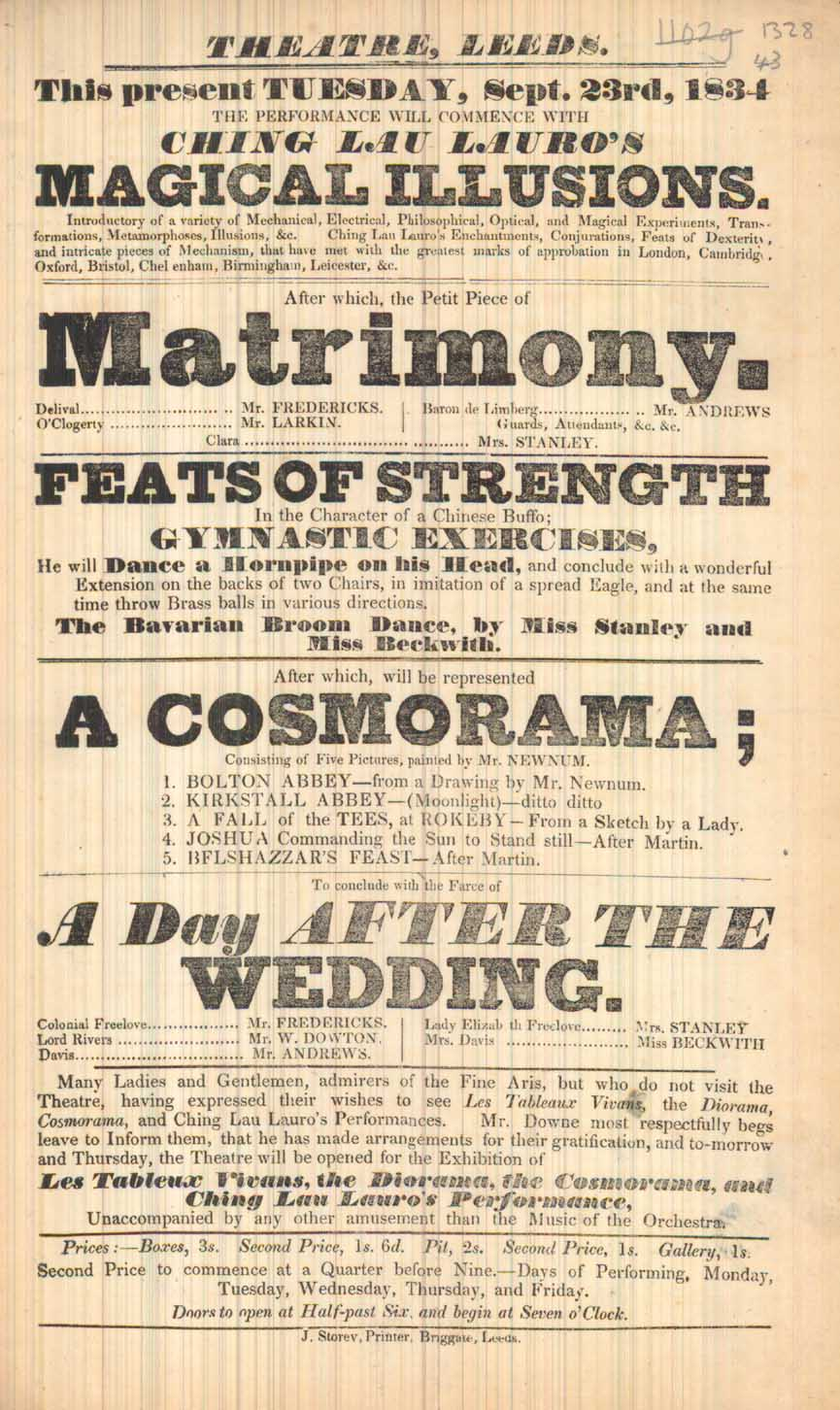
Top of the bill, Leeds 1834

Ching Lau Lauro's advertisements and popularity lasted between 1827 and 1839, after which the brief history before his death in January 1840 is unknown. He was first advertised as a juggler and then also, from 1834, as a ventriloquist and magician. His notices included "feats of strength and gymnastic exercises" and in the 1830s he described himself as "ventriloquist, melodist, naturalist and magician." Thomas Frost says that he started with posturing and balancing performances in 1828, then by 1835 he was a conjurer and ventriloquist, showing at "theatres and assembly rooms of many provincial towns, varying his entertainment with buffo songs." He could "[balance] acrobatically on two chairs and [dance] the hornpipe on his head." Following a fashion for representing historical scenes on stage, in the late 1830s he played Agrippa. There were many Roman Agrippas, but he may have been playing the Renaissance German magician.

In 1834 he played at The Theatre, Leeds.

=== Aerial suspension illusion ===
This was also referred to as the Broomstick Illusion or simply Suspension. From 1832 or 1833 he would juggle with balls, "sitting in the air upon nothing:" a version of the Suspension illusion. At that time he omitted some of the singing from his act and added the Suspension as the climax. Previous instances of Suspension are unknown in Europe. The trick of "sitting in the air upon nothing" did not use a different method from Robert Houdin's Ethereal Suspension illusion, which was performed using broomsticks and an empty ether bottle more than ten years later in 1849. However the originality of Robert-Houdin's magic has been discredited, and Ching Lau Lauro advertised similar feats before anyone else in Europe did.

== Performances ==
=== His act ===
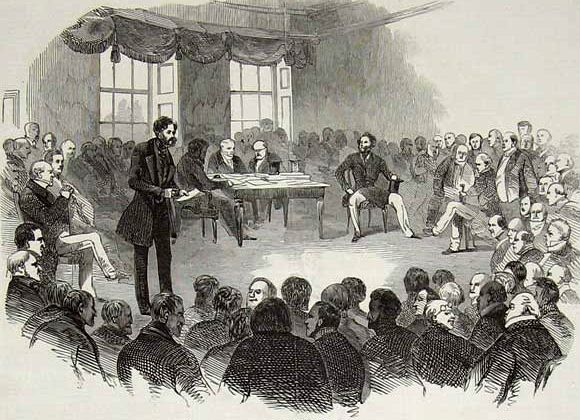
Wolverhampton Assembly Rooms where he performed his full programme in 1834

He began his theatre career by diverting the audience with a few tricks between plays, but by 1834 he was providing the whole programme at Wolverhampton's Assembly Rooms. These were on the first floor of the County Court building, built 1829 in Queen Street. The performance was in three parts. In Part I he demonstrated the Chest of Archimedes and the Column of Rosbach. These were entertaining pieces of mechanical apparatus previously shown at the cabinet of curiosities in Paris. This was followed by numerous illusions, including A Game at Whist, Time Flies, The Wax Candles Enchanted, Elephant of Knowledge, Vulcan's Forge, Miraculous Printing, Flying Watch, Magic Bottle, Apples of Beelzebub, Magic Eggs and Loyal Metamorphose. Part II began with a ventriloquist act called Rogueries of Nicholas. He followed this by whistling various birdsong impressions. This popular party piece was developed via a "variety of scenes and characters drawn from nature, introductory of His Surprising Powers of Imitation" in which he contorted his face, told stories and performed tricks of ventriloquism. In Part III he performed "feats of strength in the character of a Chinese buffo", suggesting that in Parts I and II he was most likely wearing the customary evening dress of the Victorian theatre magician, and that such a costume was less suitable for acrobatics than loose Chinese pyjamas. The strongman act was followed by "gymnastic exercises" or acrobatics involving bodily contortions with a balancing act. Last of all came the climax of the performance: the Aerial Suspension Illusion. In certain theatres he used to ban sale of tickets to the gallery, because the view from there might betray the secret of the illusion.

=== Appearances ===
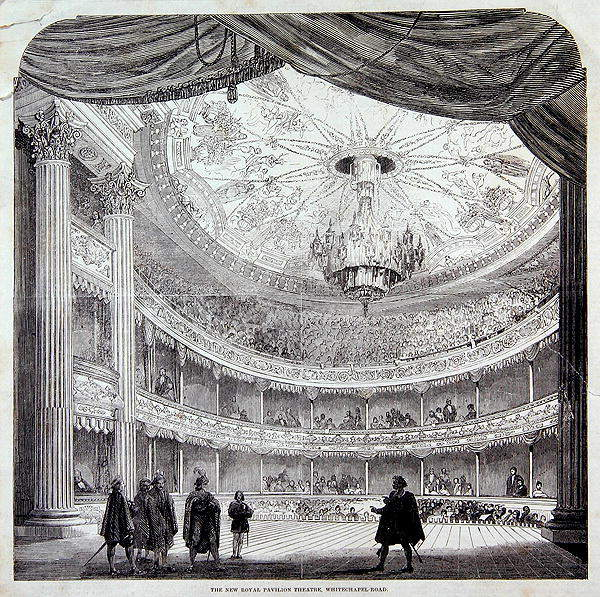
The Pavilion Theatre where he performed in 1827

His performances are known mainly through the playbills, handbills, newspaper advertisements and theatrical reviews of the period. In 1827 he performed on 25 July at the Theatre Royal in Haymarket, and on 3 September at the New Royal Pavilion, Whitechapel Road, London.

At some point in 1828 he appeared at the Royal Coburg Theatre between various plays, and in the opening scene of the third act of Tom and Jerry, at the Theatre Royal, Norwich in April, he is described as 'the celebrated posture master and buffo from Drury Lane'. On the 10th he performed in a harlequinade, entitled, The Man in the Moon. Two playbills show that in the same year he was at the Theatre Royal, Drury Lane on 2 January, and at the Royal Pavilion, Whitechapel Road on 18 February. On 7 July 1828 he was performing at Vauxhall Gardens. His name appears in advertisements in the Times of 1828: he was performing at Sadlers Wells on 24 November, at the Adelphi Theatre and Sadlers Wells on the same night of 26 November, and at Sadlers Wells again on 1 December.

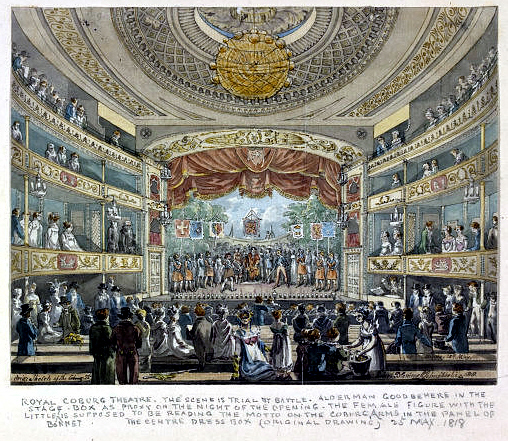
Royal Coburg, where he appeared 1828

On 15 September 1830 he performed for royalty at the Brighton Pavilion. On 13 February 1832 he was playing outside London, at the Royal Shakespeare Theatre at Stratford-upon-Avon. This was the old Shakespeare Memorial theatre which burned down in 1826, to be replaced in April 1932, just over 100 years after Ching Lau Lauro played there. On 2 February 1833 he played at Leicester. On 19 April 1834 he was playing at Huntingdon. On 30 April and 1 May 1834 he was at the Chelmsford Theatre, Chelmsford. In the same year he was playing at The Theatre, Leeds, West Yorkshire, on 15–19, 22 and 23 September. At Leeds he presented his ventriloquism, a piece called "Seraglio" and some new "Surprising Feats". He was booked for 10–14 November 1834 at Newcastle.

On 18 and 20 February 1835 he was booked to give "his wonderful performance" at the Theatre Royal, Derby, and described as "the Pacanini (sic) of all professors in rhabdomancy, ventriloquism, imitations etc. On Thursday 19 February 1835 he was expected at Repton, and on 21 February at the school room, Belper. This is possibly at the Strutt's Mansion, Green Hall. Three performances at the theatre, Stamford on 18th, 20th and 22nd were to follow his appearance on 16th at Peterborough. He was booked, probably for an outdoor show, at Cambridge University in the first week of May 1836. On 19 November 1836 he gave the last of several shows at the Hoop Assembly Rooms at Peterborough, after which he was to fulfil "many engagements at Bedford, Huntingdon etc." He appeared at the Adelphi Theatre, Dublin, on 28 December 1837. On 6 April 1838 he was in Belfast. On 28 July he is reported 'as about to exhibit his performances in Carlisle during the present week' On 26 and 27 November he and Mons. Buck performed at Banbury theatre. Following this he made a continental tour, returning to England at the beginning of 1839, when he performed in the suburbs of London. On 16 February 1839 he appeared at Windsor Town Hall. He was again due appear with Mons. Buck, this time at the Theatre, Northampton on 15 and 16 April, in Wellingborough on 18th and Kettering 19th. He appeared at the Hoop hotel, Cambridge, 28–30 November. It was advertised as 'his farewell entertainment'. The performance was said to be in three parts, as a magician, then imitations of the feathered tribe and finally as the Chinese Necromancer.

=== At Herne Bay, 1836 ===
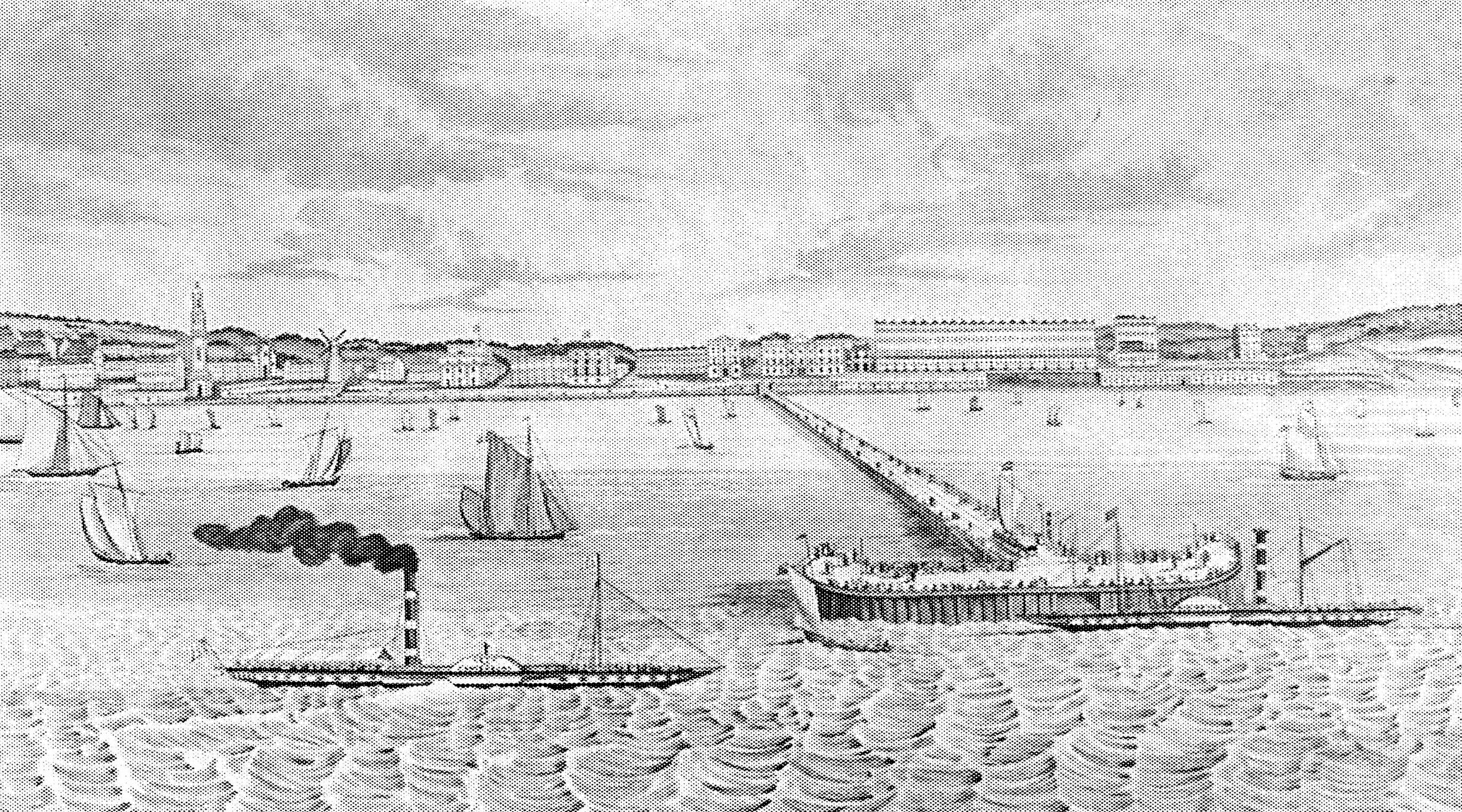
First Herne Bay Pier where he performed in 1836

On 3 October 1836 at Herne Bay, Kent, he performed on the Pier as part of the celebrations after Ann Thwaytes laid the foundation stone of the Clock Tower. This was possibly the earliest known outdoor use of limelight to illuminate a public performance. On the Pier there was ...

... a new light called koniaphostic, by which the whole pier is overwhelmed with a flood of beautiful white light, in the midst of which Ching Lau Lauro will exhibit his feats in the character of a Buffo sitting in the air upon nothing, at the same time as performing various feats of juggling and standing on his head on a pole 20 feet high surrounded by showers of fire. _{Playbill by printer G. Smith of Herne Bay, 3 October 1836}

== Reviews ==
=== Negative reviews ===
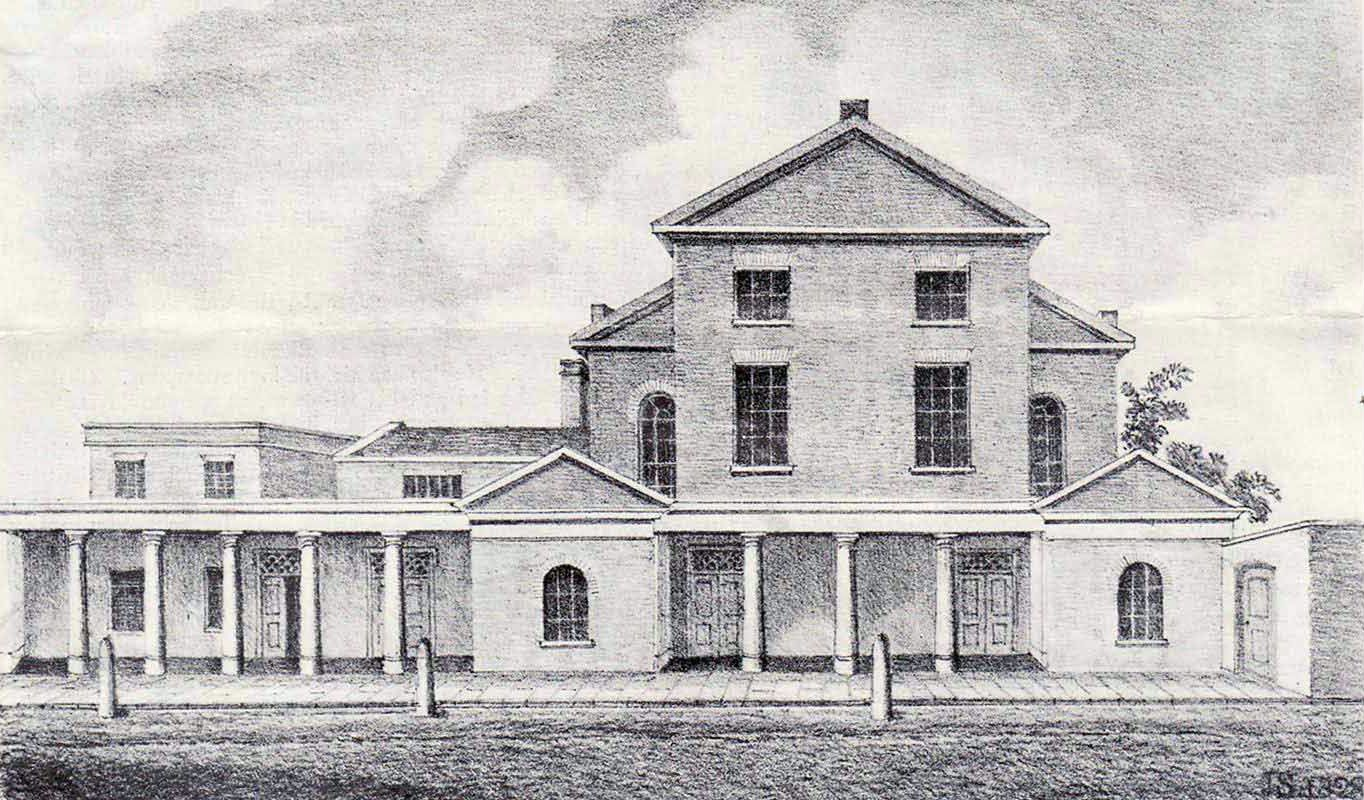
2nd Theatre Royal, Norwich where he played 1828

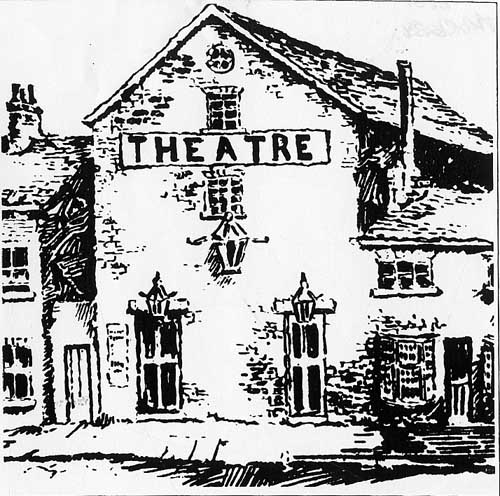
The Theatre, Leeds, where he played in 1834

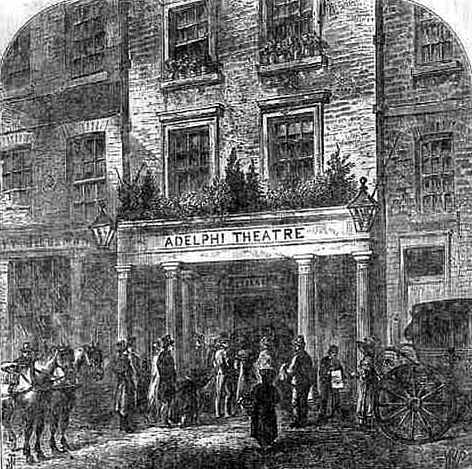
Adelphi Theatre, Dublin, where he appeared 1837

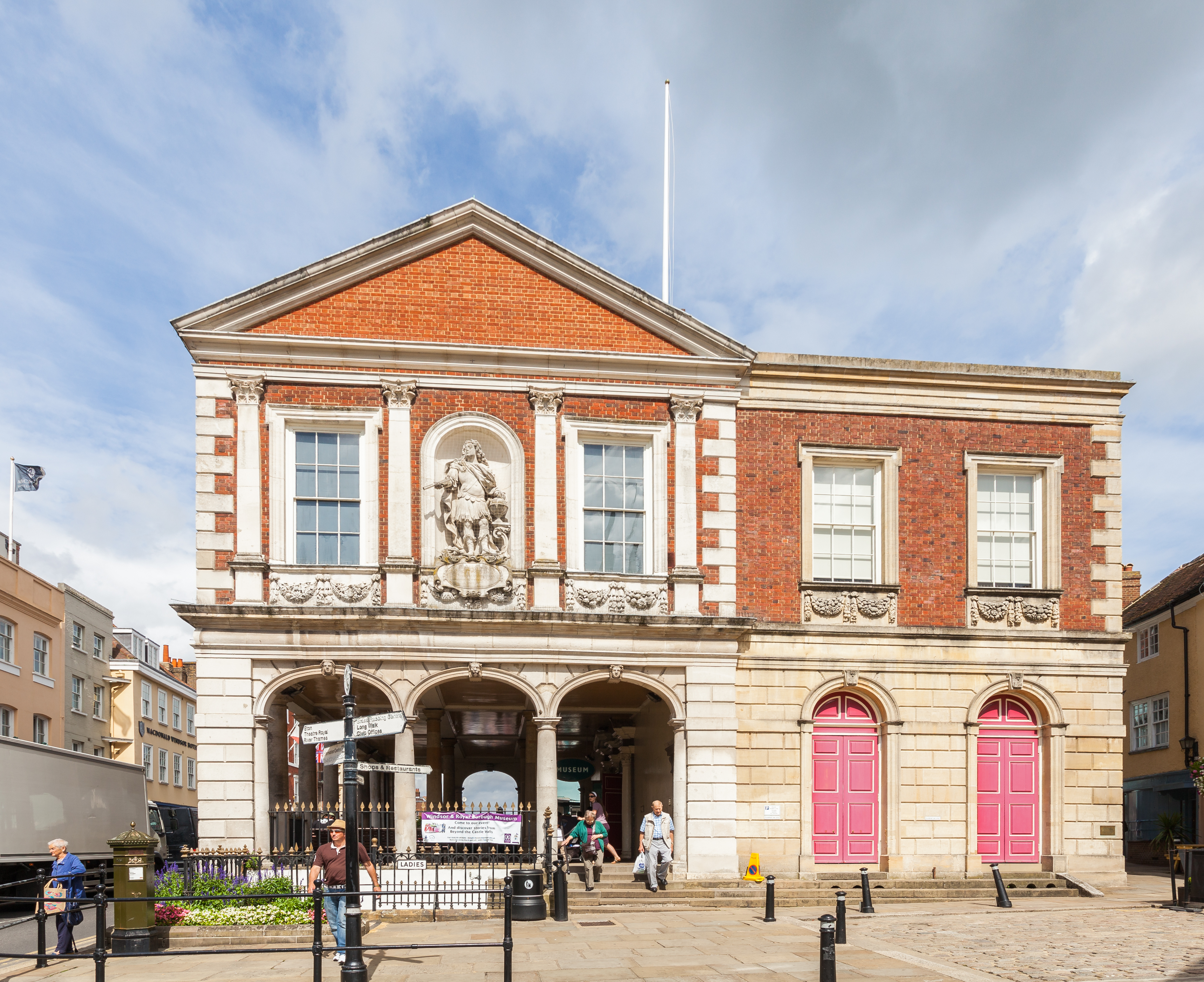
Windsor Town Hall, where he performed 1839

- In 1828 at the second Theatre Royal, Norwich (built 1826) his performance in Harlequinade: the Man in the Moon received a bad review from the Norfolk Chronicle:
  No viler tissue of nonsensical stuff could be foisted on the patience of an insulted audience. It had more revolting coarseness, and infinitely less ingenuity than ever characterised the worst puppet shows' clumsiest performers. [The second act] 'Harlequin in the Shades' descended to the lowest vault of the Capulets, amidst the universal hisses which such execrable trash duly called forth, in spite of Ching Lau Lauro swallowing his own head. _{Norfolk Chronicle 1828}
- On 12 April 1828 the Norwich Mercury said: "Thursday evening a new Harlequin performed with Ching Lau Lauro in a pantomime, to which the audience expressed strong marks of disapprobation."

=== Neutral or positive reviews ===
- On 12 April 1828, alongside the above comment regarding negative audience reception, the Norwich Mercury said:
  "Of Ching Lau Lauro's feats we are somewhat puzzled to find terms to speak. That it is most wonderful cannot be denied, and how a person, apparently well-proportioned, should not only be able to distort his limbs but to recall them to their natural position so instantaneously, and with apparently so little or no exertion, is not less extraordinary. We truly cannot find language to enable our readers to form any adequate idea of his performance, and we must therefore recommend those who delight in such exhibitions, or who possess some curiosity to know of what the human frame is capable, to visit the theatre tomorrow evening."
- On 7 July 1828 at the Vauxhall Gardens the "annual juvenile fete took place at the above fairy scene of summer amusement on Saturday evening. The weather proved fine and the company, which consisted of between five and six thousand, was most select. The gardens were illuminated by several thousand additional lamps ... Ching Lauro [sic] exhibited his feats of posture and equilibrium to the astonishing gaze of the spectators."
- On 17 October 1831 the Reading Mercury reported that in Henley "this town has been visited for the last two nights by the celebrated Ching Lau Lauro who has been performing his wonderful feats of skill and agility at Reading, and he certainly deserves all the praise that has been bestowed on him. He is to perform here until Tuesday next, when he will take his benefit."
- On 2 February 1833 the Leicester Chronicle said: "Ching Lau Lauro, naturalist and professor of rhabdomancy, who met with the greatest success at Drury Lane and Vauxhall Gardens, is now in this town. His ventriloquism is excellent, but his imitations of singing birds and domestic animals are sufficient of themselves to merit the attention of the public. His feats of strength, too, are wonderful; but still more extraordinary is it, that a well-proportioned person should be able, not only to distort his limbs, but instantly to recall them to their proper position."
- On 19 April 1834, the Huntingdon, Bedford and Peterborough Gazette said: This remarkable person during the four days that he has performed in this town appears to have given ample satisfaction."
- On 2 May 1834, the Essex Chronicle said that at Chelmsford Theatre, Chelmsford on 30 April and 1 May:

He fully sustained the reputation which had travelled to Chelmsford before him from various parts of the kingdom. His legerdemain is right marvellous and after one or two of his tricks we fancied that a smell of sulphur pervaded the house; the lights certainly turned blue. His posturing and transformations are most extraordinary; he all but jumped down his own throat. We know not to which legion of the spirits of darkness he belongs, but at all events he is a harmless devil, and in speaking well of him we are only giving the devil his due._{Repeated in Derby Mercury 18 February 1834 and in Essex Chronicle 2 May 1834}

- On 8 November 1834, the Newcastle Journal said:
  This extraordinary personage, whose feats have attracted crowded audiences in almost every large town in the empire, has announced his intention of giving five performances in Newcastle, next week. Our contemporaries in Leeds, York, Manchester and other places, have been superlative in their praises of Ching, and although his name would intimate that he is from the Celestial Empire, several have not scrupled to ascribe to him rather too near an affinity with the prince of darkness. After reading their elaborate notices of astonishing feats, we incline to the latter opinion; and shall not give credence to all that is asserted, until we have had ocular demonstration. This we declared to the magician, but our scepticism is greatly removed by a perusal of testimonials from Sir Herbert Taylor (expressive of the delight of their Majesties, before whom Ching had the honour to perform) and similar letters in the hand-writing of the Earl of Denbigh the Earl of Bradford, the Marquis of Westminster, and many other Noblemen and Gentlemen. We understand Ching's arrangements will leave him sufficient leisure to attend upon private parties at the neighbouring mansions, and, as to his public performances we doubt not they will be patronized as they deserve. Numerous testimonials are left in the office of the Newcastle Journal for inspection. _{Newcastle Journal 8 November 1834}
- On 28 December 1837, the Dublin Journal at the Adelphi Theatre said that "those whose taste tends more to the wonderful cannot but feel agreeably surprised at the magic powers of Ching Lau Lauro."
- On 6 April 1838 the Belfast Newsletter said:
  The performances of this unrivalled Magician are still numerously attended, and the recent reduction of the admission prices has tended to increase the nightly assemblages. If amusement of the highest order be an object of attraction, we can with confidence recommend to universal notice, the pleasing variety of entertainments supplied by the talented performer in question._{Belfast Newsletter 6 April 1838}.
- During his last year, on 16 February 1839, the Windsor and Eton Herald was quoted as saying, "The celebrated illusionist Ching Lau Lauro amused a large and respectable company at the town hall on Monday last, by his clever and inimitable performances."

=== Commendations ===
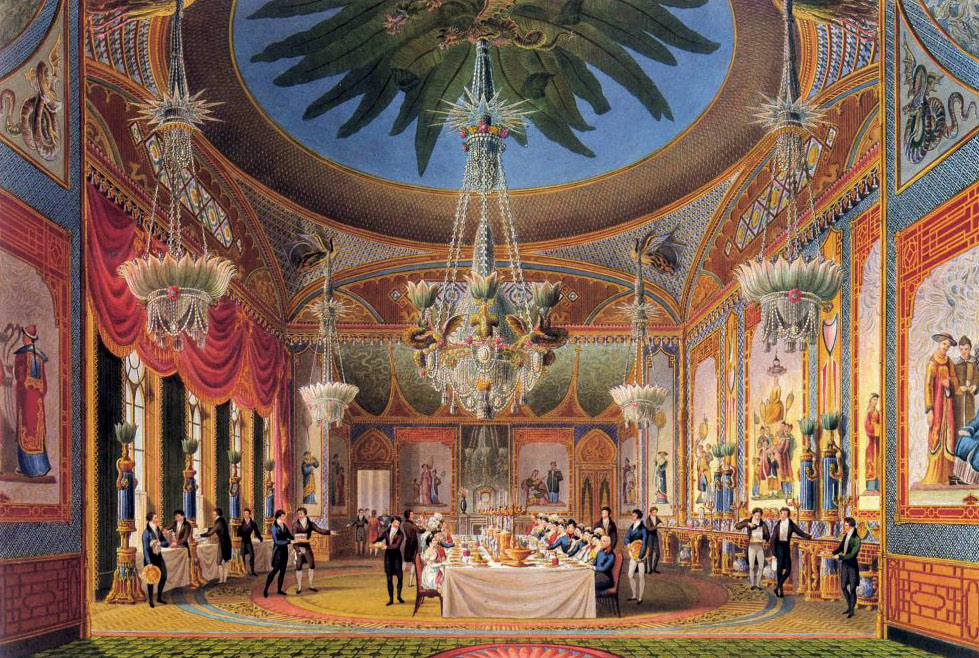
Brighton Pavilion where he performed for William IV

- In 1830 he performed at the Brighton Pavilion for William IV and Queen Adelaide and promptly received a letter of commendation from their secretary:
  Sir, by their Majesties' command, I have to state that your various performances at the Pavilion, on the 15th of September 1830, were approved by their Majesties. I am sir your obedient servant, H. Taylor. _{Reproduced on a playbill, Wolverhampton 10–14 March 1834}.
  The same playbill states that he had received similar letters of approval from the Earl of Denbigh, the Earl of Bradford and the Marquis of Westminster.

== Bibliography ==
- Bundock, Mike (2000). Herne Bay Clock Tower: A descriptive history. Herne Bay: Pierhead Publications. ISBN 9780953897704. Contains archive images
- During, Simon (2004). Modern Enchantments: The Cultural Power of Secular Magic. London: Harvard University Press. ISBN 9780674013711.
- Frost, Thomas (1876). The Lives of the Conjurers. London: Tinsley Brothers. pp. 221–222.
- Nichols, John (1840). The Gentleman's Magazine. Vol. 167. F. Jeffries.
- Schlicke, Paul (2003). Dickens and Popular Entertainment. Routledge. ISBN 9780203206768.
