= Compars Herrmann =

German magician (1816–1887)

Compars (Carl) Herrmann
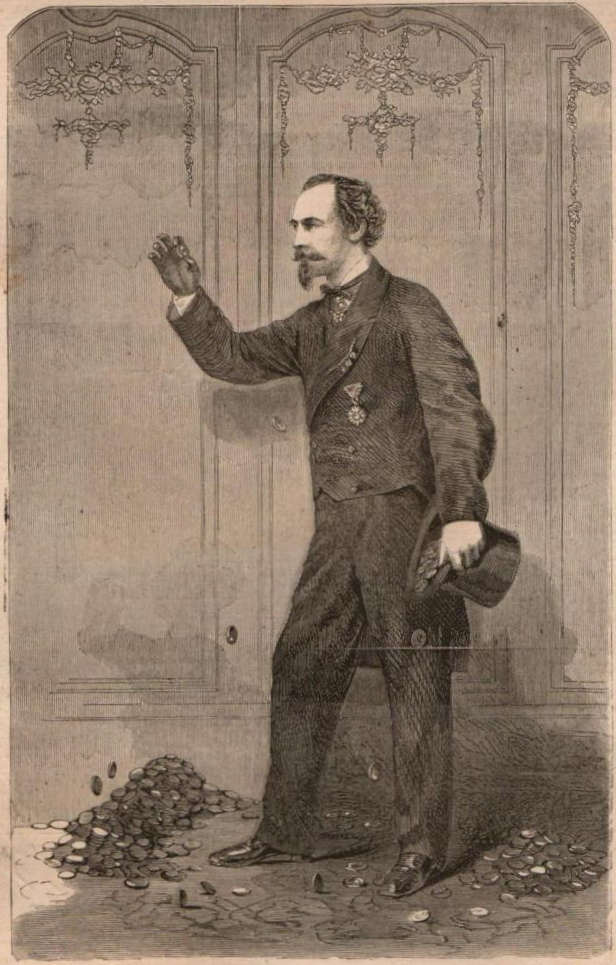
- Prof. Herrmann
- Born: January 23, 1816; Hanover, Germany
- Died: June 8, 1887 (aged 71); Karlsbad, Germany
- Occupations: Magician, Illusionist
- Notable credit(s): Performed for the crowned heads of Europe: Emperor Franz Joseph I of Austria, King Ludwig I of Bavaria, King Don Pedro V of Portugal, King Frederick VII of Denmark, and Queen Isabella II of Spain
- Relatives: Alexander Herrmann (brother); Leon Herrmann (nephew)

Carl (Compars) Herrmann (1816–1887) was a German illusionist and magician. He was part of what has been referred to by some as the "first-family of magic". Carl's father Samuel, a practicing German physician, was the first to enjoy magic as a hobby. Samuel's first son Carl (Compars), was born in 1816 and left medical school at an early age to pursue a career as a magician. He was the first in the family to gain fame as a conjurer. By the age of thirty, Carl was recognized as one of Europe's most accomplished magician. Alexander Herrmann, who was 27 years younger than his brother Carl, also became a world-famous magician.

== Father's career as magician ==
According to Herrmann legend, Alexander's father was a part-time magician and full-time physician. Samuel Herrmann was a favorite of the Sultan of Turkey, who sent for the magician often. The Sultan paid a princely sum for the entertainment. It was said that Samuel even performed for Napoleon Bonaparte. The story goes that he was receiving so much attention from the elite of Paris with his magic shows, that word spread to Napoleon himself. The self-crowned emperor wanted Samuel to perform for him. Napoleon reportedly gave Samuel a gold watch for his performance. Alexander carried the gold watch on the day of his death. It was passed on to his widow.

Eventually his practice demanded more of his time, so he eventually quit magic entirely. With the birth of his oldest son Compars in 1816 in Hanover Germany, he decided to settle down to continue his practice.

This is the myth. The reality is confusing. Some reports say that Samuel was never a professional magician, but a physician who only did magic as a hobby. Another report says that he was never a physician, but rather was a traveling magician who never quite achieved fame, as his son was soon to do.

He played small towns around from 1817 in Germany and moved his family to France. He played institutes and lyceums of Paris and gave performances until 1855. He taught his skills to his oldest son Compars, also known as Carl. There is no record of him performing in well known theatres. But he did play the colleges in Paris and Versailles. Samuel entertained the pupils of the Grandes écoles (founded by Lazare Carnot) near Versailles. With this performance, his son Carl was admitted to the school tuition free.

Samuel continued in this way even after his son Carl became a famous magician. Samuel retired about 1860 and lived quietly with his wife Anna on a pension set up by Carl.

== Early years ==
Carl, was slender, somewhat demonic in appearance. He wore an imperial beard and handlebar moustache to perpetuate or enhance the Mephistopheles look. As he got older the hair on is head got thin. Carl's humor was sly, and he presented his magic in a mysterious manner. He was from the old school of magic. The critics of his day said his performing ability was on par with the most talented actors, singers, and dancers of the 19th century.

While attending classes at Grandes écoles, he tried to fit in with his upper crust classmates at the prestigious school. He went to Fontainebleau (which was a commune in the metropolitan area of Paris) with his classmates. Fontainebleau was renowned for its large scenic forests which surrounded the city and dozens of villages. It was a favorite weekend getaway for Parisians, as well as for the reigning monarchs of the time.

Young Carl played on the palace grounds with his friends as a cavalcade came up the road. They realized they were trespassing so they fled leaving poor Carl to take the fall. So Carl swiftly climbed a tree in the dense Forest of Fontainebleau. Even though he was hidden by the thick foliage, he began to trill bird calls.

Two young princes of King Louis-Philippe of France, Antoine and Henri, heard the trills. They wanted to catch a glimpse of the birds. They parted the leaves and saw the grinning Carl perched inside. The citizen king and the ladies in the carriage were so amused, they invited him to entertain at the palace.

Carl lived in Paris as a young man. His father, Samuel, urged him to study medicine. But Carl was more interested in performing. He had early success as a magician, but tried to please his father by earning a living away from the stage. He was in his twenties when he was out of work and desperate for money. So turned to the only profession he knew and that was magic.

== Career ==
Carl left school and joined a company of actors. From there he branched out on his own. He started off like all magicians today and that is with doing school shows. Then he progressed to private performances. From there, he got hired to perform at theatre exhibitions.

He practiced ventriloquism as well as magic. His career was interrupted by his services with the French Army. When he left the army, he returned to France. While there, he was a constant visitor to the Théâtre Robert-Houdin, starring its namesake, Jean Eugène Robert-Houdin. He was most impressed by the many new illusions presented by the former watchmaker turned magician. Illusions were new at the time and Carl thought it would nice to own such fine tricks.

He finally earned enough to buy equipment for a three-hour production. He bought most of his illusions from Robert-Houdin's trusted assistant LeGrande. LeGrand made replicas of Houdin's equipment and sold them to French magician Robin, Scottish magician John Henry Anderson, and Carl. Herrmann set out to tour with his own show.

The first stop for Carl was England. He took the pirated tricks to London and first appeared at the Adelphi Theatre. In 1848, Carl performed at the Haymarket Theatre in London where he billed himself as the Premier Prestidigitateur of France and the First Professor of Magic .

In 1848, The Illustrated London News critiqued the 32-year-old magician's performance in April. "He was not only adept at tricks of his predecessors Phillipe and Doebler had shown, he also introduced several striking new mysteries of his own." They praised tricks like the Inexhaustible Bottle , which produces endless quantities of different liquors in what seems to be an endless quantity; The Portfolio, items such as flowers, turtle doves, and a live boy would be produced from the empty portfolio; and the Second Sight, items are named from a blindfolded assistant.

What the Illustrated London News did not know was that those marvels where created by Robert-Houdin in Paris. When he premiered in London later in the year at the St. James Theatre, Robert-Houdin was not happy with his friend presenting duplicates of his tricks. Also, he was annoyed by Carl's title. He felt he was the Premier Prestidigitateur of France. Herrmann was glad to let him have the title. But did keep The First Professor of Magic in the World.

Two years later he took Robert-Houdin's pirated illusions and performed in Germany, Austria, and Italy. In Portugal, he was decorated by the king and became Chevalier Herrmann. It was during this tour he was developing his sleight of hand skill and adapting them to his program. After producing four goldfish bowls, he would walk into the audience and invited the spectators to inspect his arms and his long coattails. Those that assumed this was where they came from would not expect there could be more. Then from the same cloth, Carl produced a fifth bowl.

== Carl kidnaps little brother ==
After Carl finished his tour of Europe, he returned to his parents’ home in Paris in 1853. He was greeted by his fifteen brothers and sisters. He was most taken in with the youngest Alexander. Carl was thrilled to find out that the eight-year-old Alexander was already showing an interest in magic. So, without the family consent, Carl kidnapped the young man and took him to Saint Petersburg, Russia to teach him the art of magic. While there, he took his younger brother with him on a tour that started in Russia. He suspended his young brother before Czar Nicholas I. The then nine-year-old acted as a blindfolded medium in the Second Sight. Czar Nicholas gave Carl an engraved gold watch decorated with diamonds, pearls, and amethysts.

Alexander remained with Carl until they arrived in Vienna. Samuel did not want Alexander to suffer the same fate as Carl. His father was ready to bring kidnap charges against him. Samuel's anger caused their mother to come there and insisted upon Alexander's return to Paris. They reached a compromise. Alexander would stay with Carl until the tour was over. Alexander continued his duties as assistant.

Carl didn't just teach Alexander how to pop out of boxes, he served as a role model and inspiration for his younger brother. He was teaching him advance sleight of hand. Some that he had learned from their father. He also taught him new moves that Carl picked up on his own. He was thrilled that Alexander was an eager and willing student. Carl continued with this throughout their excursion through Europe. After touring places like Germany, Austria, Italy, and Portugal, the tour ended in Vienna. Carl liked it so much, he made Vienna his home. As promised, he sent Alexander back home to Paris.

While there, Alexander showed what he had learned from Carl to their father. Samuel was impressed with Alexander's skill. He decided to let him continue in magic. Carl was to mentor his young brother. Alexander stayed in Paris until he was about 11 years old. Then he returned to Vienna to meet up with Carl. He promised Samuel to teach Alexander things other than magic. While in Vienna Alexander attended college. But, it was sleight of hand that was to be his main interest.

== Carl mentors Alexander ==
Alexander went with Carl on nearly every tour. At first he returned to his role as assistant. This time though he did not float on a pole. Carl discarded those illusions from the last tour when Robert-Houdin discovered that LeGrand was responsible for selling replicas of the fruits of his creations. He had the mechanic arrested. It is not known whether Carl bought the illusions directly from LeGrand or from another source. What is known is that he discarded them in favor of tricks using pure sleight of hand. He found that the audiences enjoyed these tricks better.

His new approach brought him triumphs in Brazil, Uruguay, and Argentina. In January 1861 he was in Havana, Cuba. His admirers said, "You don't need a wand to work your imitable wonders. But," they added, "We thought you merited the finest one ever made." They presented him with a diamond sapphire gold wand. Engraved on the staff was his portrait along with an inscription. Carl added this to his ever growing collection.

From Cuba, they sailed to New Orleans. There he gave his first twenty-four performances in the United States at the St. Charles Theatre. The only thing that stopped the run was the outbreak of the American Civil War. Carl and Alexander packed their bags quickly and caught the last train north. Without any bookings, they sought the prominent New York opera impresario B. Ullman. Ullman arranged for the Herrmann's to perform at the Academy of Music on 14th St. The impresario told reporters that Prof. Herrmann's magic, "…was as much acknowledged in Europe as Jenny Lind's was in music."

Carl was impressed with the progress of his brother Alexander's skills. He decided to have Alexander became a real part of Carl's show. By the time they arrived in the America in 1860, Alexander was seventeen. Audiences noticed his adroitness. His dexterity soon rivaled that of Carl. Jealously brewed on that tour, but never surfaced.

They appeared at the Academy of Music which is generally known for their operas, but when the Herrmanns arrived the music played second fiddle to the wonders the two wizards produced. The posters of the time mentioned that Herrmann's, "… distinguishing feature is the entire absence of any apparatus, all effects being solely produced by extraordinary manual skill." During the beginning of their show, Carl announced that his younger brother was his successor-to-be.

Five weeks of full houses brought Carl receipts totaling thirty-five thousand dollars ($1,100,000 in 2024 dollars). With the Civil War in full swing, the Herrmann's headed for Central and South America.

A few years later, they parted company. Alexander appeared on his own until he met up with Carl in Vienna in 1867. They formed their second co-partnership and returned to the U.S. to resume their tour there. According to Walter B. Gibson's book The Magic Masters, "...and implanted the name Herrmann quite firmly there." The Herrmann name eventually became synonymous with magic. Eventually the two magic brothers would go their separate ways.

== Carl tours Europe ==
With the departure of Carl, Alexander began his own career in 1862. Carl returned to play to the capitals of Europe. Alexander brought his own show to London in 1871 and began his three-year stretch at Egyptian Hall that he called his one thousand and one nights.

Carl retired during Alexander's three-year stint at Egyptian Hall. Meanwhile, the financial panic of 1873 wiped out Carl. On May 9, the Vienna Stock Exchange crashed. They no longer were able to bankroll the corrupt mismanagement of the Deutsche Bank. A series of Viennese bank failures resulted. This caused a deflation of the money available for business lending.

He needed money and the only way to pay his debts was to return to performing. The two magical brothers met again in 1885 in Paris. Carl was still miffed at Alexander from his triumph at Egyptian Hall. Carl was not about to retire until he regained his fortune. So, an agreement was made between the two brothers to split the world. Compars was to return to Europe and Alexander to the United States.

== The death of Prof. Herrmann ==
Alexander leaves Paris to go back to America. He becomes an established institution. A few years later, While in New York, Alexander heard the news of the death of his brother Carl. Professor Herrmann died on June 8, 1887, in Karlsbad in Germany. Alexander was very shocked. Even with the rivalry between them, he could not help but feel that he owed everything to him. "We've always had a warm and brotherly feeling towards each other", he told a newspaper.

After Carl's death in 1887, Alexander continued with the profession until his own death in 1896. The Herrmann name continued as Alexander's wife Adelaide became the first woman to win notable fame as a magician. Alexander's nephew Leon had accompanied Adelaide, adding another "Herrmann" name to the magical family tree. Leon died in 1909, at the age of 42.
