= Adelaide Herrmann =

English magician and vaudeville performer (1853–1932)

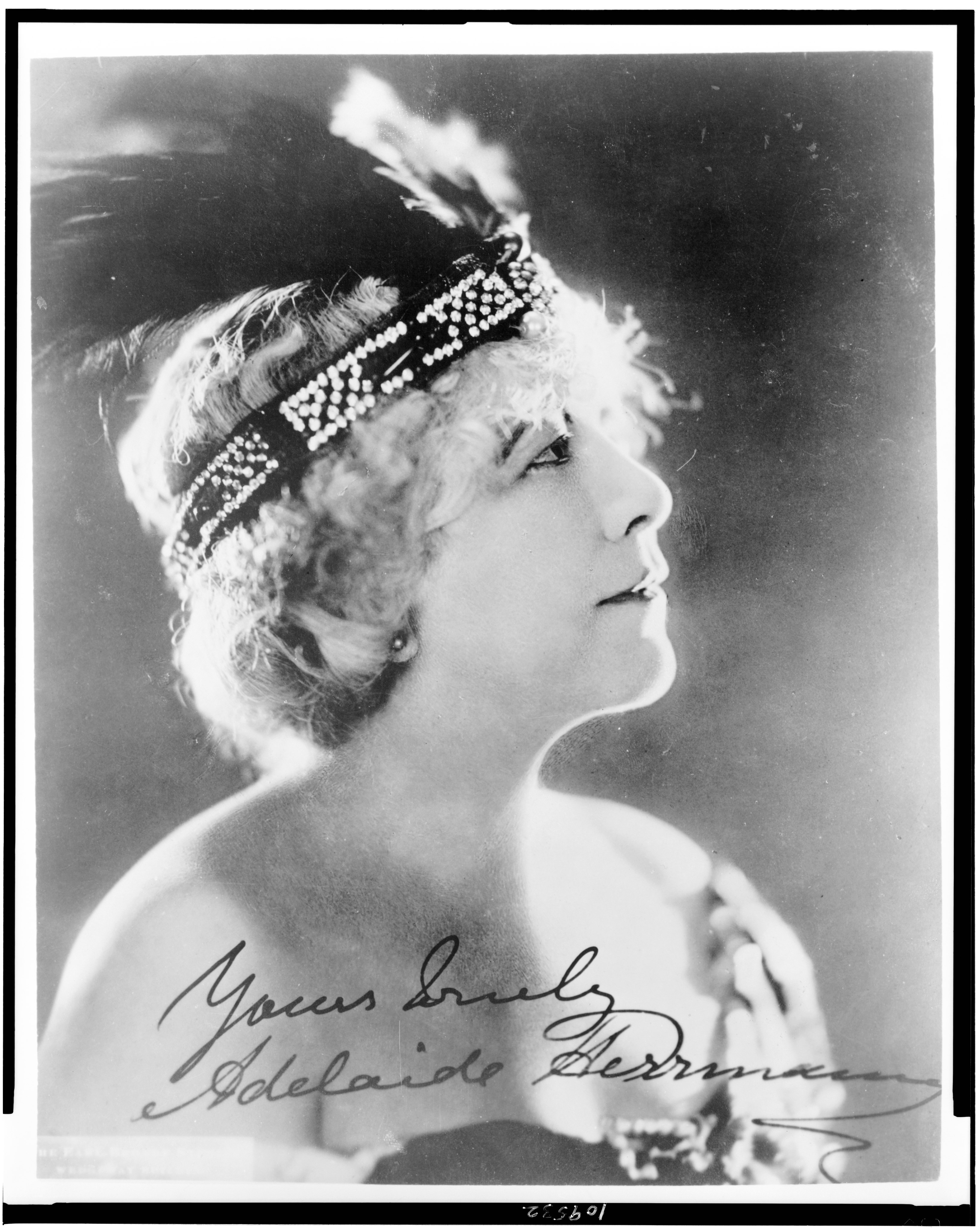
- Herrmann as Sleeping Beauty
- Born: Adelaide Scarcez (Scarsia); 1853; London, England
- Died: February 19, 1932 (aged 78–79); New York, NY

Adelaide Herrmann (1853–1932) was an English-American magician and vaudeville performer billed as "the Queen of Magic". She was married to Alexander Herrmann, another magician.

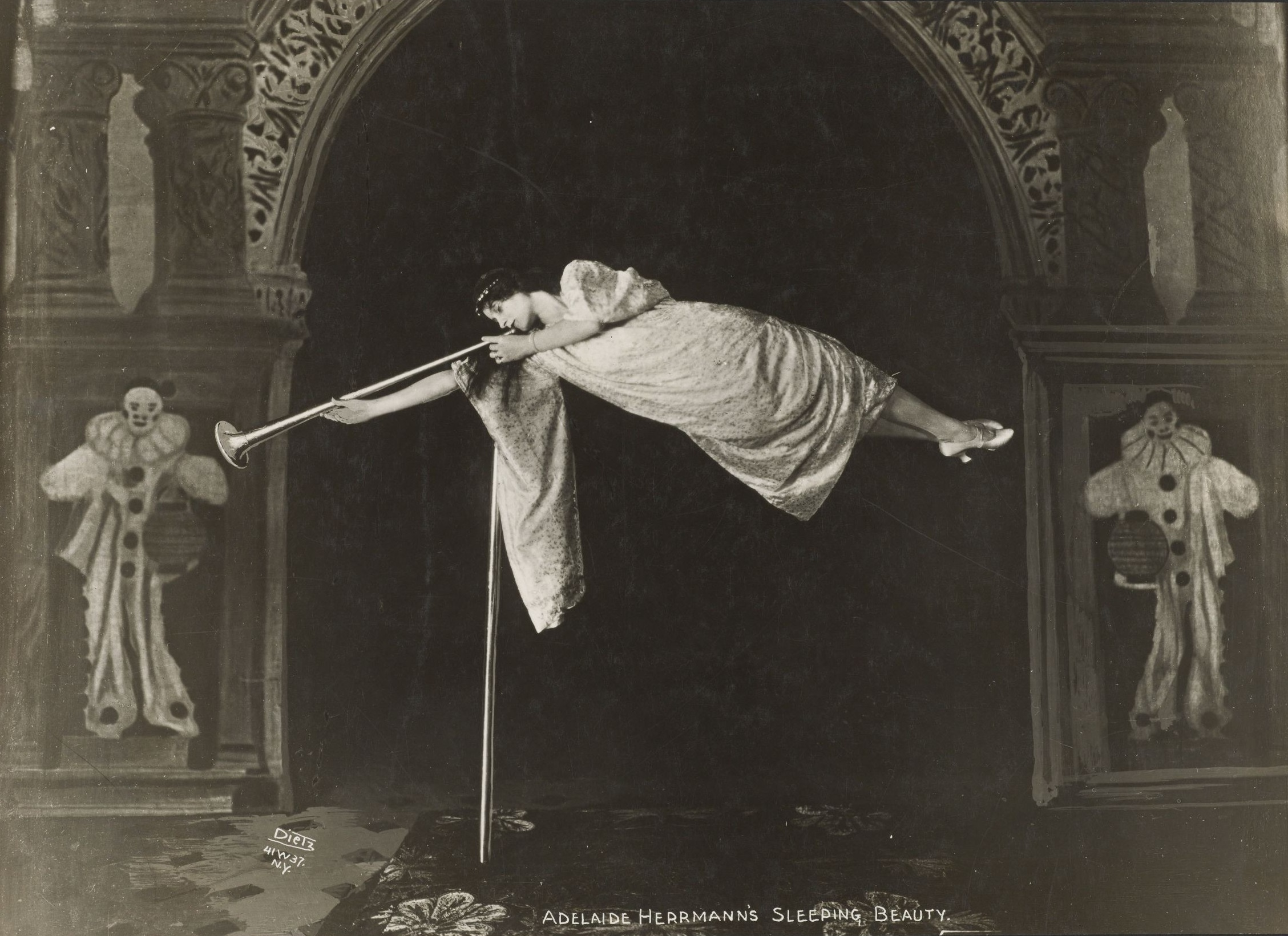
Adelaide Herrmann performing

== Early career ==
Adelaide Herrmann was born Adelaide Scarcez (also spelled Scarsia) in 1853 in London. Her father, who was born in Belgium, helped establish the Egyptian Hall.

As a young woman, she studied aerial acrobatics and dance. She learned to ride the velocipede, a 19th-century bicycle, and traveled as a trick-rider with Professor Brown's velocipede troupe. In 1874, she came to New York City as a dancer for Imre Kiralfy.

She began her magic career as assistant to her future husband, magician Alexander Herrmann. They married in 1875 at City Hall, where New York City Mayor William H. Wickham performed their ceremony. Together, Alexander ("Professor Herrmann" or "Herrmann the Great") and Adelaide entertained audiences with a variety of magic tricks, including escape tricks and the bullet catch trick. Adelaide was a key part of many illusions, performing as a levitating sleeper, a human cannonball, a bicycle rider who carried a girl on her shoulders, and a dancer who spectrally swirled in red silk like a pillar of fire. The Herrmanns toured the United States, Mexico, South America, and Europe.

In 1888, the Herrmanns put on a show wherein they revealed how the spiritualist Ann O'Delia Diss Debar was a fraudulent medium in front of journalists.

== Solo career ==
When Alexander died in 1896, Adelaide Herrmann decided to continue the show. She initially worked with her husband's nephew, Leon Herrmann, but a clash of personalities led them to part ways after only three seasons.

Afterwards, Adelaide Herrmann became extremely well known as a magician in her own right, earning the moniker "The Queen of Magic." She toured as a headliner for over 25 years and performed internationally, touring London and Paris. In 1903, she made her Broadway debut at the Circle Theater. She performed often with other vaudeville acts and was frequently mentioned in the New York Times. In a November 2, 1899 article for Broadway Magazine entitled "The World’s Only Woman Magician," Herrmann stated, "I shall not be content until I am recognized by the public as a leader in my profession, and entirely irrespective of the question of sex."

Herrmann was one of the few magicians to perform the "bullet catch" trick, and possibly the only woman magician to perform the trick at the time. Despite reports that she had disliked watching her husband perform the dangerous trick, on January 19, 1897, a month after his death, she stood in his place in front of a firing squad at the Metropolitan Opera House in New York City. Surviving publicity material describes her as catching six bullets fired at her by local militiamen.

Her favourite illusion was "The Phantom Bride," which had themes of loss and marriage. Through "hypnotism," she made a bride's body, draped in white, rise on a brightly lit stage. She passed a hoop over her hovering form, showing there were no wires, then pulled away the white silk — the bride was gone. In "The Witch" illusion, she stumbled onto the stage dressed as an old woman, trying to reach a fire burning in the darkness. When she finally arrived at the pyre, she dove into the flames. Unlike her older "Cremation" act, where she returned as a taunting ghost, she now emerged reborn and youthful.

Her "Noah’s Ark" was her greatest vaudevillian hit. At first, an ark was shown empty, then buckets of water symbolizing the flood were poured down its chimney. Soon two cats, one black and one white, climbed from the chimney, while a gangplank emerged over which prowled a parade of dogs in costumes of birds, leopards, lions, tigers, zebras, and elephants. A flock of white doves flew from the windows, and the biblical boat opened to reveal a lounging woman dressed in white.

Herrmann continued performing into her 70s until 1926, when a warehouse fire at a theatrical warehouse on West 46th Street in Manhattan destroyed her props and killed most of the animals used in the "Noah's Ark" illusion. She rebounded briefly with a pared-down show called "Magic, Grace and Music," highlighting the three elements at which she'd excelled in her career. The National Vaudeville Artists’ Year Book from 1928 shows Herrmann in her final performing year.

Herrmann died of pneumonia on February 19, 1932. She is buried at the Woodlawn Cemetery, New York.
