= Jean-Eugène Robert-Houdin =

French magician (1805–1871)

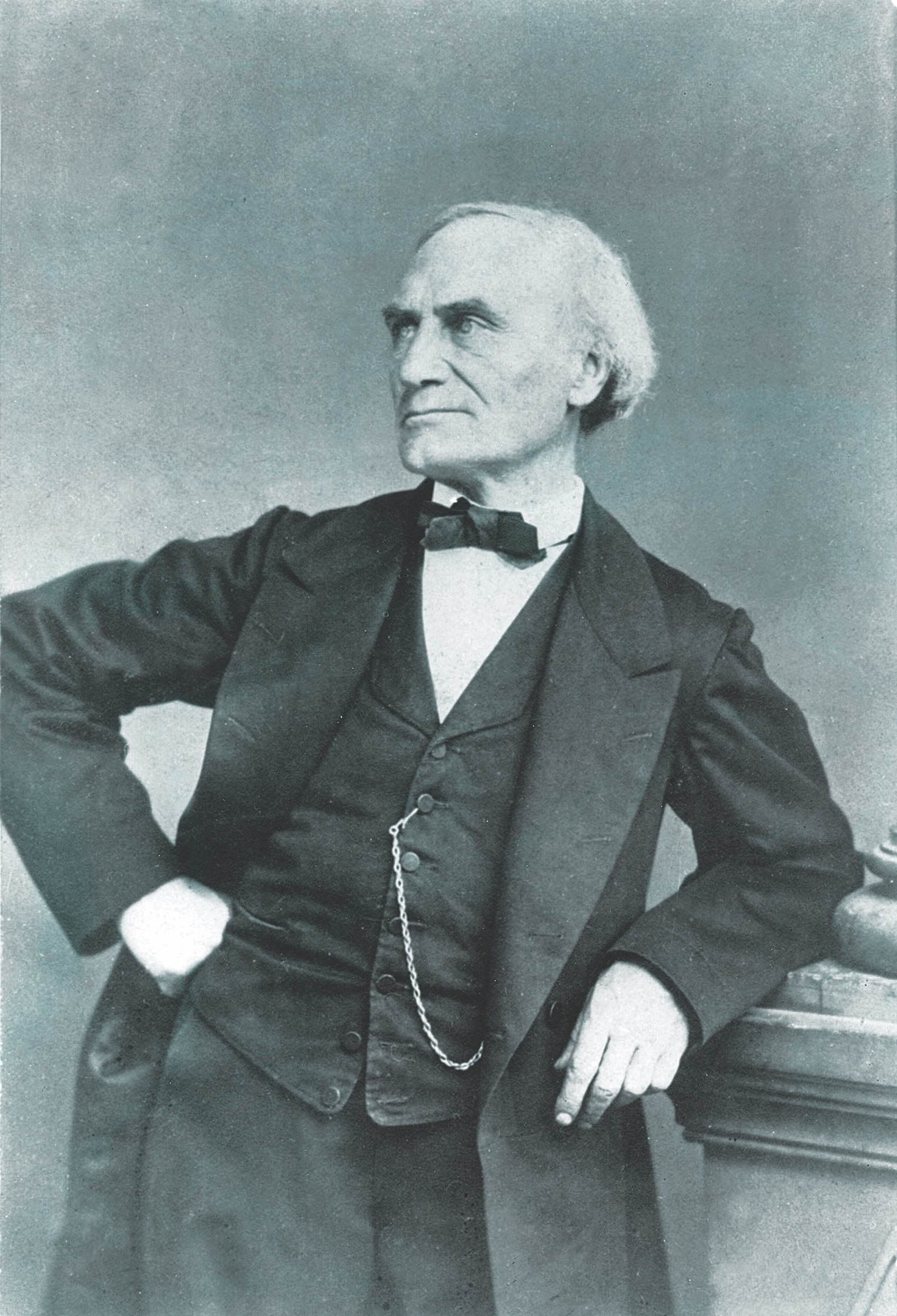
- Born: Jean-Eugène Robert; 7 December 1805; Blois, France
- Died: 13 June 1871 (aged 65); Saint-Gervais-la-Forêt, France
- Occupations: Magician, illusionist, inventor, author, and clockmaker
- Spouse(s): Josèphe Cecile Houdin (m. 1830; died 1843) Françoise Marguerite Olympe Braconnier (m. 1844)

Jean-Eugène Robert-Houdin (French pronunciation: [ʒɑ̃ øʒɛn ʁɔbɛʁ udɛ̃]; 7 December 1805 – 13 June 1871) was a French watchmaker, magician and illusionist, widely recognized as the father of the modern style of conjuring. He transformed magic from a pastime for the lower classes, seen at fairs, to an entertainment for the wealthy, which he offered in a theatre opened in Paris, a legacy preserved by the tradition of modern magicians performing in tails.

== Early life and entrance into conjuring ==
Robert-Houdin was born Jean-Eugène Robert in Blois, France, on 7 December 1805—a day after his autobiography said he was. His father, Prosper Robert, was a watchmaker in Blois. Jean-Eugene's mother, the former Marie-Catherine Guillon, died when he was just a young child. At the age of eleven, Prosper sent his son Jean-Eugène to school thirty-five miles up the Loire to the University of Orléans. At 18, he graduated and returned to Blois. His father wanted him to be a lawyer, but Robert-Houdin wanted to follow in his father's footsteps as a watchmaker.

=== Apprentice clockmaker ===
His penmanship was excellent, and it landed him a job as a clerk for an attorney's office. Instead of studying law, he tinkered with mechanical gadgets. His employer sent him back to his father. He was told that he was better suited as a watchmaker than a lawyer, but by then, Jean's father had already retired, so he became an apprentice to his cousin who had a watch-shop. For a short time, Jean-Eugène worked as a watchmaker.

In the mid-1820s, he saved up to buy a copy of a two-volume set of books on clockmaking called Traité de l'horlogerie ("Treatise on Clockmaking"), written by Ferdinand Berthoud. He would go on to pursue the craft of clockmaking for the rest of his life, and is widely credited with inventing the mystery clock.

=== Introduction to magic ===
When he got home and opened the wrapping, instead of the Berthoud books, what appeared before his eyes was a two-volume set on magic called Scientific Amusements. Instead of returning the books, his curiosity got the better of him. From those crude volumes, he learned the rudiments of magic. He practiced at all hours of the day.

From that point on, he became very interested in the art. He was upset that the books he got only revealed how the secrets were done but did not show how to do them. He found that learning from the books available in those days was very difficult due to the lack of detailed explanations, but the books piqued his interest in the art. So Robert-Houdin began taking lessons from a local amateur magician. He paid ten francs for a series of lessons from a man named Maous from Blois who was a podiatrist but also entertained at fairs and parties doing magic. He was proficient at sleight of hand, and taught Robert-Houdin how to juggle to improve his hand-eye coordination. He also taught him rudiments of the cups and balls. He told young Robert-Houdin that digital dexterity came with repetition, and as a direct result, Robert-Houdin practiced incessantly.

Magic was his pastime, and meanwhile, his studies in horology continued. When he felt he was ready, he moved to Tours and set up a watchmaking business, doing conjuring on the side.

Much of what we know about Robert-Houdin comes from his memoirs—and his writings were meant more to entertain than to chronicle, rendering it difficult to separate fact from fiction. Robert-Houdin would have readers believe that a major turning point in his life came when he became apprenticed to the magician Edmund De Grisi, Count's son and better known as Torrini. What is known is that his early performing came from joining an amateur acting troupe.

=== Marriage to Josèphe Cecile Houdin ===
He performed at social parties as a professional magician in Europe and the United States. It was during this period while at a party that he met Josèphe Cecile Houdin, the daughter of a Parisian watchmaker, Jacques-François Houdin, who also originally came from Blois. Jean-Eugène fell in love with her at their first meeting. On 8 July 1830, they were married; he then hyphenated his own name to hers and became Robert-Houdin. He and Josèphe had eight children, of whom three survived.

He moved to Paris and worked in his father-in-law's wholesale shop. Jacques-François was among the last of the watchmakers to use the old method of handcrafting each piece and embraced his new son-in-law's ambitions for mechanism. While Houdin worked in the main shop, Jean-Eugène was to tinker with mechanical toys and automatic figures. With his work in the shop, Jean-Eugène was still practicing magic. Quite by accident, Robert-Houdin walked into a shop on the Rue Richelieu and discovered that it sold magic. He visited the store, which was owned by a Père (Papa) Roujol. There, he met fellow magicians, both amateur and professional, where he engaged in talk about conjuring, and he met an aristocrat by the name of Jules de Rovère, who coined the term "prestidigitation" to describe a major misdirection technique magicians used.

At Papa Roujol's, Robert-Houdin learned the details to many of the mechanical tricks of the time as well as how to improve them. From there, he built his own mechanical figures, like a singing bird, a dancer on a tightrope, and an automaton doing the cups and balls. His most acclaimed automaton was his writing and drawing figure. He displayed this figure before King Louis Philippe I and eventually sold it to P. T. Barnum.

On 19 October 1843, Josèphe died at the age of thirty-two, having been ill for months. At her death, having three young children to take care of, he remarried in August to Françoise Marguerite Olympe Braconnier, a woman ten years younger, who soon took over the household.

Robert-Houdin loved to watch the big magic shows that came to Paris. He dreamed about some day opening his own theatre. In the meantime, he was hired by a friend by the name of Count de l'Escalopier to perform at private parties.

Now that he had free time, he began constructing equipment for his own use instead of selling it to others. The income from the shop and his new inventions gave him enough money to experiment on new tricks using glass apparatus that would be (or at least appear to be) free of trickery. He envisioned a stage that would be as elegant as the drawing rooms in which he was hired to perform. He also decided that a magician should be dressed as such by wearing traditional evening clothes.

=== Opening the "Palais Royale" ===
He obtained financial backing from Count de l'Escalopier, who fronted him the 15,000 francs to turn his vision into reality. He rented out a suite of rooms above the archways around the gardens of the Palais Royal, which was once owned by Cardinal Richelieu. He hired workmen to redesign the old assembly room into a theatre. They painted it white with gold trim. Tasteful drapes were hung, chic candelabras were placed throughout, and the stage furniture was set in the style of Louis XV.

On 3 July 1845, Robert-Houdin premiered his 200-seat Théâtre Robert-Houdin in what he called "Soirées fantastiques". No critics covered Robert-Houdin's debut, and in his memoirs, Robert-Houdin said that the show had been a disaster. He suffered from stage fright that caused him to talk too fast and in a monotone. He said that he did not know what he was saying or doing, and everything was a blur. He believed that a magician should not present a trick until it was mechanically perfected to be certain of avoiding failure, and this caused him to over-rehearse.

After the first show, he was close to having a nervous breakdown. He closed the theatre and had every intention to close it for good, until a friend agreed that the venture was a silly idea. Instead of admitting defeat, Robert-Houdin, irked at the friend's effrontery, used this insult to regain his courage, and persevered in giving the show a long run at his little theatre. Although the forty-year-old magician was unpolished at first, he soon gained the confidence required for the stage.

With each performance, Robert-Houdin got better, and he began to receive critical acclaim. Le Charivari and L'Illustration both said that his mechanical marvels and artistic magic were comparable to those of his predecessors like Philippe and Bartolomeo Bosco. Even with all of this, still relatively few people would come to the little theatre during the summer months, and he struggled to keep it open. To meet expenses, he sold the three houses that he had inherited from his mother.

The following year, he added a new trick to his programme that became especially popular. Seats at the Palais Royal were at a premium. This new marvel was called Second Sight drew the audiences into the little theatre. Once there, they saw the other creations Robert-Houdin had to offer. He also performed outside Paris, sometimes with local magicians, as he did in Liège in 1846 with the then well-known Belgian magician Louis Courtois.

== Famous illusions ==
Robert-Houdin combined his mechanical abilities along with "showmanship, humour, and artistic handling" to produce his illusions. Robert-Houdin felt that every magic programme should be arranged so one trick builds upon the others. One surprise should lead to an even bigger surprise. Some of the tricks and illusions Robert-Houdin presented became classics. Here are a few of them.

=== Second sight ===
When Robert-Houdin first opened his theatre, it was sparsely attended and he realized that he needed something more extraordinary that would bring the public to his theatre. So he came upon the idea of doing a two-person mind-reading act, concocting a silly story about how his son Émile had created a game of hot and cold that resulted in Robert-Houdin using it for the stage.

He named the trick "Second Sight", a title that was already used by magicians such as John Henry Anderson, but the effect was entirely different. Anderson had a box into which items were inserted. The medium would then describe the contents inside. In Robert-Houdin's version, he walked into the audience and touched items that the audience held up, and his blindfolded assistant, played by his son, described each one in detail. It caused a sensation and brought the throng to see his shows.

Eventually, Robert-Houdin changed the method, so instead of asking his son what was in his hands, he simply rang a bell. This stunned those that suspected a spoken code. He would even set the bell off to the side and remain silent, and his son still described every object handed to his father.

Robert-Houdin made the test even more difficult. He placed a glass of water into his son's hands, and Émile proceeded to drink from it. He was able to perceive the taste of the liquids that spectators from the audience merely thought of. Even then, the audiences were not entirely convinced; they tried to trip up Émile by bringing in books written in Greek, or odd tools such as a thread counter.

=== The ethereal suspension ===
During Robert-Houdin's time, all of Paris was enthusiastically talking about the mysterious uses of "ether". He took advantage of this by presenting an illusion that appeared to use the pungent liquid. He told the audience that he had discovered a marvelous new property of ether. "If one has a living person inhale this liquid when it is at its highest degree of concentration, the body of the patient for a few moments becomes as light as a balloon," Robert-Houdin claimed.

He proceeded to "prove" just that. He placed three stools on a wooden bench. His youngest son Eugène stood on the middle one. With the instructions from his father, he extended his arms. Robert-Houdin placed two canes on top of the stools and positioned them under his son's arms.

He took a vial of ether and opened it. The audience smelled it wafting through the theatre. He placed the vial under his son's nose, and he went limp. In reality, the vial was empty, with the odour being produced by his son Émile pouring real ether on a hot iron shovel.

Robert-Houdin took the stool away from his son's feet, and he just hung limp as a rag. He took away one of the canes, so he was dangling by one arm, and carefully placed his head against his upraised hand. This was startling enough. What he did next was stunning. He lifted his boy upright in a horizontal position by his little finger and then let go until he was suspended in mid air. Robert-Houdin stepped away to leave his son in that suspended state, balanced only by his right elbow and no other support.

When it was apparent that the drug was wearing off, Robert-Houdin returned his son to his upright position. When he woke up, he seemed no worse for wear. Robert-Houdin built up the surprise of spectators until, "… by gradually heightening it up to the moment when, so to speak, it exploded." This brought letters of protest against Robert-Houdin, thinking he was putting his son's health in jeopardy, although the ether had nothing to do with the trick.

Robert-Houdin was not the first to perform the Levitation Illusion. The first in Europe was Ching Lau Lauro in the 1830s. The illusion was also reported to be performed by an Indian conjuror before that, but sitting cross-legged rather than lying down.

=== The Marvelous Orange Tree ===
This trick was likely inspired by the Indian mango tree trick, where a performer would grow a tree from a seed to a sprout, then into a tree with fruit. On one of Robert-Houdin's side tables, he had an egg, a lemon, and an orange. He went into the audience and borrowed a lady's handkerchief that was in style then. He rolled it into a ball. He rubbed the ball in between his hands, and the handkerchief got smaller and smaller until it disappeared, passing through to the egg on the table.

Carefully, he picked up the egg. The audience expected him to crack it open and produce the spectator's handkerchief. Instead, he made that disappear too. He told the audience that the egg went to the lemon. This was repeated with the lemon and the orange. When he made the orange disappear, all that was left was a fine powder. This was placed into a silver vial. He soaked this vial with alcohol and set it on fire.

A small orange tree planted in a wooden box was brought forth by one of his assistants. The audience noticed that the tree was barren of any blossoms or fruit. The blue flame from the vial was placed underneath it. The vapors from it caused the leaves to spread and sprout orange blossoms from it. Robert-Houdin then picked up his magic wand and waved it. The flowers disappeared and oranges bloomed forth.

He plucked the oranges from the tree and tossed them to the audience to prove they were real. He did this until he only had one left. He waved his wand again, and the orange split open into four sections, revealing a white material of sorts inside of it. Two clockwork butterflies appeared from behind the tree. The butterflies grabbed the end of the corner of the white cloth and spread it open, revealing the spectator's handkerchief.

The Marvelous Orange Tree trick was used by the eponymous conjurer in Steven Millhauser's short story "Eisenheim the Illusionist" and its film adaptation The Illusionist (2006), where a more complex variant is shown. It is also alluded to in Donald Barthelme's short story "Sentence".

=== Robert-Houdin's portfolio ===
Robert-Houdin brought in under his arm a large portfolio used for holding documents or art work. The portfolio was only about one and three-quarters of an inch thick, too small or too thin to hold anything but pictures.

He set it on two thin trestles to hold the case with the spine facing the audience. He removed the expected drawings from it. One of those pictures showed a bareheaded woman. Then, he produced two lady's bonnets decorated with flowers; one for winter, the other for summer. He lowered the flap for each production. Then, he showed a picture of birds, followed by a stuffed bird flat as a pancake. With that, he proceeded to produce from the portfolio four live turtle doves.

He showed a picture of a cartoon of two cooks fighting with pots. This was followed by three enormous copper pots. One was filled with beans, another with flames bursting forth, and the third pot was filled with boiling water. As an afterthought, he lifted the top flap of the portfolio and pulled out a large cage filled with birds.

He walked forward towards the audience with the square cage, and they applauded thinking the trick was over. "Nothing here now—neither anything, nor anybody," he said as he knocked on the upright flap. For a finale, he closed the portfolio one last time and produced his young son from it.

=== The light and heavy chest ===
The number of tricks he invented for his theatre was extensive, but his most remarkable one was the "Light and Heavy Chest". He took advantage of the infancy of the usage of electricity, especially the then-novelty of Hans Christian Ørsted's discovery of electromagnetism, to his advantage. Robert-Houdin brought on a small wooden box about a foot wide. He said that he had found a way to protect it from thieves. He asked a spectator to lift it, usually a small child. The child lifted it with ease. Then, he brought an adult male up from the audience and asked him to lift the same box. The adult male was unable to lift the box.

== Inventions pirated ==
Robert-Houdin's inventions were pirated by his trusted mechanic Le Grand, who was arrested for making and selling duplicate illusions. Many of those illusions fell into the hands of his competitors, such as John Henry Anderson, Robin, Robert Heller, and Compars Herrmann. It is not known whether Herrmann or the others bought the illusions directly from LeGrand or from another source, but they willingly performed the illusions after knowing that they were invented by Robert-Houdin.

== Robert-Houdin on tour ==
Robert-Houdin's little theatre became a mecca for magic enthusiasts. Herrmann was a constant visitor to the Palais Royal. It became the place for the Paris elite to go. Even King Louis Philippe rented out the room for a private performance. After the triumph he gave at the Royal Palace, in 1847, the king decided to take his entourage to see Robert-Houdin at the Palais Royal.

The following February, a revolution ended the reign of Louis-Philippe. With it, show business also ended. The Revolution closed all Parisian theatres. Robert-Houdin shut down his theatre and went on the road. He toured the Continent briefly, and then he headed off to Great Britain.

With a company of French dramatists, Robert-Houdin made his English debut at the St. James Theatre in London. He presented his programme three times a week. Much to his dismay, he found out that Compars Herrmann had beaten him to the territory. Not only was he billing himself as "the Premier Prestidigitateur of France", but he was also using pirated versions of his illusions. Despite this, Robert-Houdin still accomplished a success there. So much so, in 1848, he did a command performance for Queen Victoria. After a three-month tour of England, he went back home after about a year and a half away. He reopened the theatre and became a permanent fixture in Paris. In 1850, he handed the Palais Royal to his brother-in-law Hamilton (Pierre Etienne Chocat). This left him free to tour France. He did so for two years. Then he went to Germany and on a return engagement to England, where he ended up performing a second time for Queen Victoria.

He did a brief tour of France and then, at the age of 48, retired from public performances. He gave the theatre back to Hamilton, who continued to fill the little theatre. After Robert-Houdin retired, he devoted himself to his inventions with electricity and his writings. His home, "Le Prieuré" (the Priory), was a marvel in advancement.

== Magic mission to Algeria ==
In 1856, he was asked by Napoleon III to pacify the tribes in French Algeria. During this period, the French Army commanders maintained order in the newly pacified region. They supervised local Muslim administrations and the "bureaux arabes". These areas were closed off to colonization by the Europeans. Napoleon III was worried about religious leaders called Marabouts. The Marabouts were able to control their tribe with their faux magical abilities. They advised their leaders to break ranks with the French. Napoleon wanted Robert-Houdin to show that French magic was stronger.

The magical mission began with an informal show at the Bab Azoun Theatre in Algeria, where he would give performances twice weekly. He also gave many special galas before the country's tribal chiefs. He used The Light and Heavy Chest during these performances, but instead of playing it for comedy as he had in Paris, here he played it straight. Robert-Houdin once invited the strongest tribesman on stage and asked the Arabian to pick up the wooden chest placed on stage. The Arabian picked it up with no problem. Then Robert-Houdin announced that he was going to sap his strength. He waved his wand and declared: "Contemplez ! Maintenant vous êtes plus faible qu'une femme; essayez de soulever la boîte." ("Behold! Now you are weaker than a woman; try to lift the box.") The Arabian pulled on the handle of the chest, but it would not budge. He tried and tried until he tried to rip it apart. Instead, he screamed in pain, as Robert-Houdin had rigged the box to give the Arabian an electrical shock if he tried to rip the handles off. The Arabian let go of the handle, ran off into the aisle, and ran screaming out of the theatre.

After his performances were done, he gave a special presentation for several chief men of their tribe. He was invited to the home of the head of the tribe of the desert interior, Bou-Allem. In dawn of the Arab desert, Robert-Houdin was challenged to do a special trick. He obliged by inviting one of the rebels to shoot at him with a marked bullet, which he caught between his teeth. He was given a certificate from Bou-Allem, who wore a red robe symbolizing his loyalty to France. With this scroll praising his mysterious manifestations, Robert-Houdin went back to France with the mission accomplished.

"The blow was struck", Robert-Houdin said, "...henceforth the interpreters and all those who had dealings with the Arabs received orders to make them understand that my pretended miracles were only the result of skill, inspired and guided by an art called prestidigitation, in no way connected with sorcery". He went on to say, "The Arabs doubtless yielded to these arguments, for henceforth I was on the most friendly terms with them." He was rewarded for his services by the French government for suppressing any possible rebellion.

== Retirement and death ==
After his mission in Algeria was completed, Robert-Houdin gave his last public performance at the Grand Théâtre in Marseille, then returned to his home in Saint-Gervais, near his native Blois, where he wrote his memoirs, Confidences d'un Prestidigitateur. He also wrote several books on the art of magic. He lived happily in retirement for about fifteen years, until the advent of the Franco Prussian War. His son Eugène was a captain in a Zouave regiment. On 6 August 1870, Robert-Houdin heard news of his son being mortally wounded at the Battle of Wörth. Meanwhile, Hessian Soldiers captured Paris, and Robert-Houdin hid his family in a cave near his property. The Russian soldiers were very rude, according to Robert-Houdin, but he found the Polish soldiers to be a lot kinder.

Four days later, Robert-Houdin was to find out that his son had died of his wounds. With the stress from that and the war, his health deteriorated, and he contracted pneumonia. On 13 June 1871, he died of his illness at the age of 65.

== Legacy ==
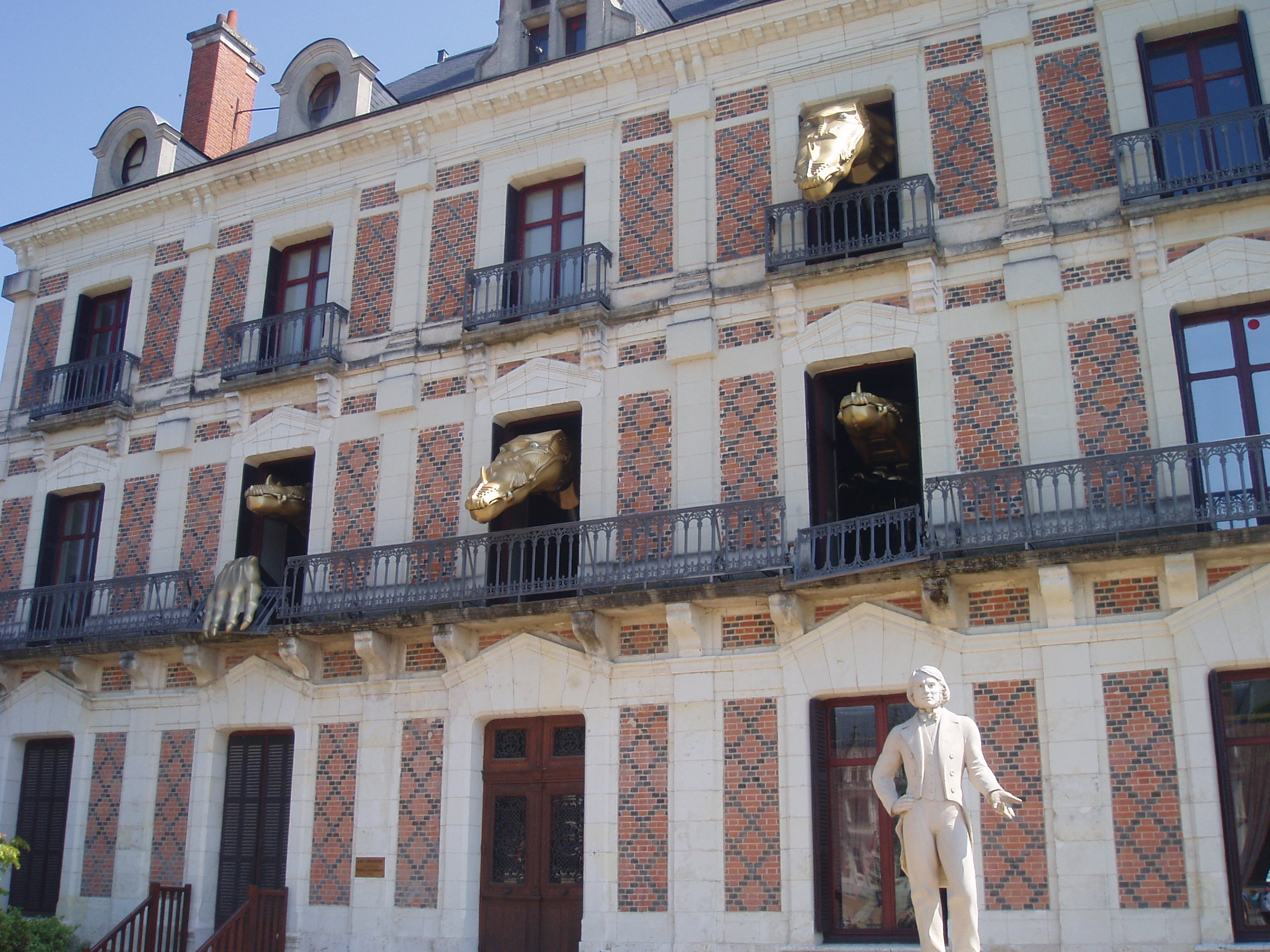
This is the public "dragons" display at Jean Eugène Robert-Houdin's house in Blois, which has been turned into a museum. The "dragons" move in and out of the windows in a theatrical display. A statue of Robert-Houdin is at lower right.

His home in Blois is open to the public as the publicly owned La Maison de la Magie Robert-Houdin. It is a museum and theatre first opened by his grandson Paul Robert-Houdin in April 1966. As a museum of France and bearing the official label of "Musée de France", it is the only public museum in Europe that incorporates in one place collections of magic and a site for permanent performing arts. The creation of such a site is directly linked to the personality of Robert-Houdin. Several of Robert-Houdin's apparatuses, including automata and mystery clocks, reside in David Copperfield's private museum.

In December 1852, the Theatre Robert-Houdin moved from its original location to the Boulevard des Italiens in Paris. Ownership passed from Hamilton to Cleverman (François Lahire), then to Robert-Houdin's son Émile. Emile was too busy to perform at the theatre, so he arranged for Pierre Edouard Brunnet to present the show.

After his death, Émile's widow sold the theatre to Georges Méliès in 1888. Méliès, himself a magician but best known to history as one of the greatest early innovators of film making, later presented his first movies there. He accidentally discovered stop-action special effects and presented his creation at the Theatre Robert-Houdin. One of his classics is A Trip to the Moon. In 1924, the building was demolished.

Robert-Houdin's autobiography is The Memoirs of Robert-Houdin. His life and works are also cited in Robertson Davies's Deptford Trilogy, notably in the trilogy's third novel, World of Wonders, which takes place on the set of a movie about Robert-Houdin.

In his book Hiding the Elephant, Jim Steinmeyer said that every magician of the 20th century was "haunted" by Robert-Houdin, "... who cast an enormous shadow over their generation". Hungarian-American magician and escape artist Harry Houdini (born Ehrich Weiss) was so impressed by Robert-Houdin that, after reading his autobiography in 1890, Weiss adopted the stage name of "Houdini" in honour of Robert-Houdin. He incorrectly believed that an i on the end of a name meant "like" in French; but Houdini, his own career and reputation established by that time, later lost his youthful respect for Robert-Houdin, believing that he took undue credit for other magicians' innovations, and wrote The Unmasking of Robert-Houdin in 1908.

Robert-Houdin is often credited as being "the father of modern magic". Before him, magicians performed in marketplaces and fairs, for the lower classes, but Robert-Houdin performed magic in theatres and private parties for wealthier patrons. He also chose to wear formal clothes, like those of his more upscale audiences, which has become a tradition for many modern magicians who wear tail-coats.

Many cities have streets that bear his name: Blois, Bourges, Caen, Paris (11th), Saint-Étienne, and Saint-Gervais-la-Forêt in France; Monticiano in Siena, Italy; and others.

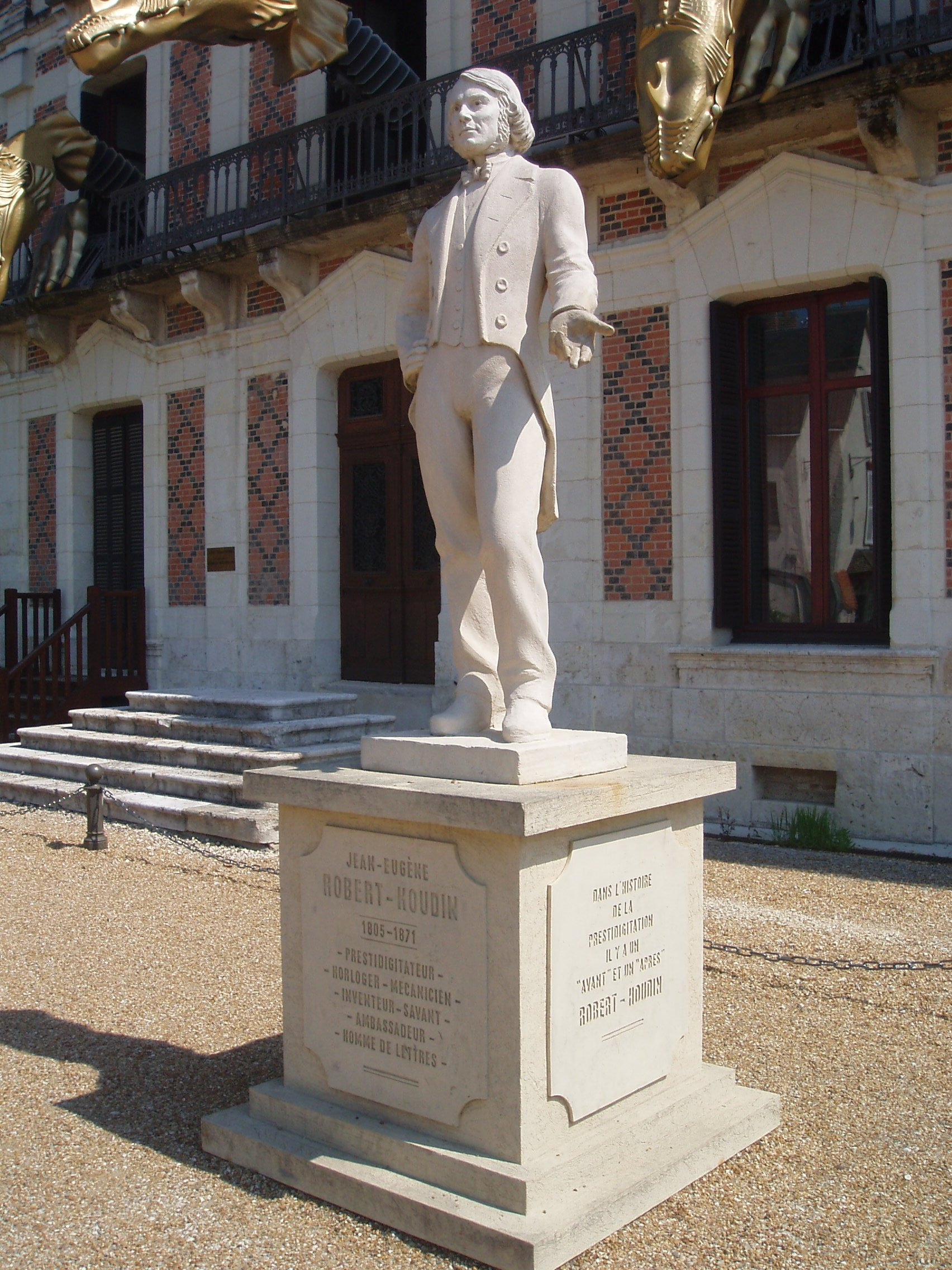
Statue in front of Robert-Houdin's home in Blois

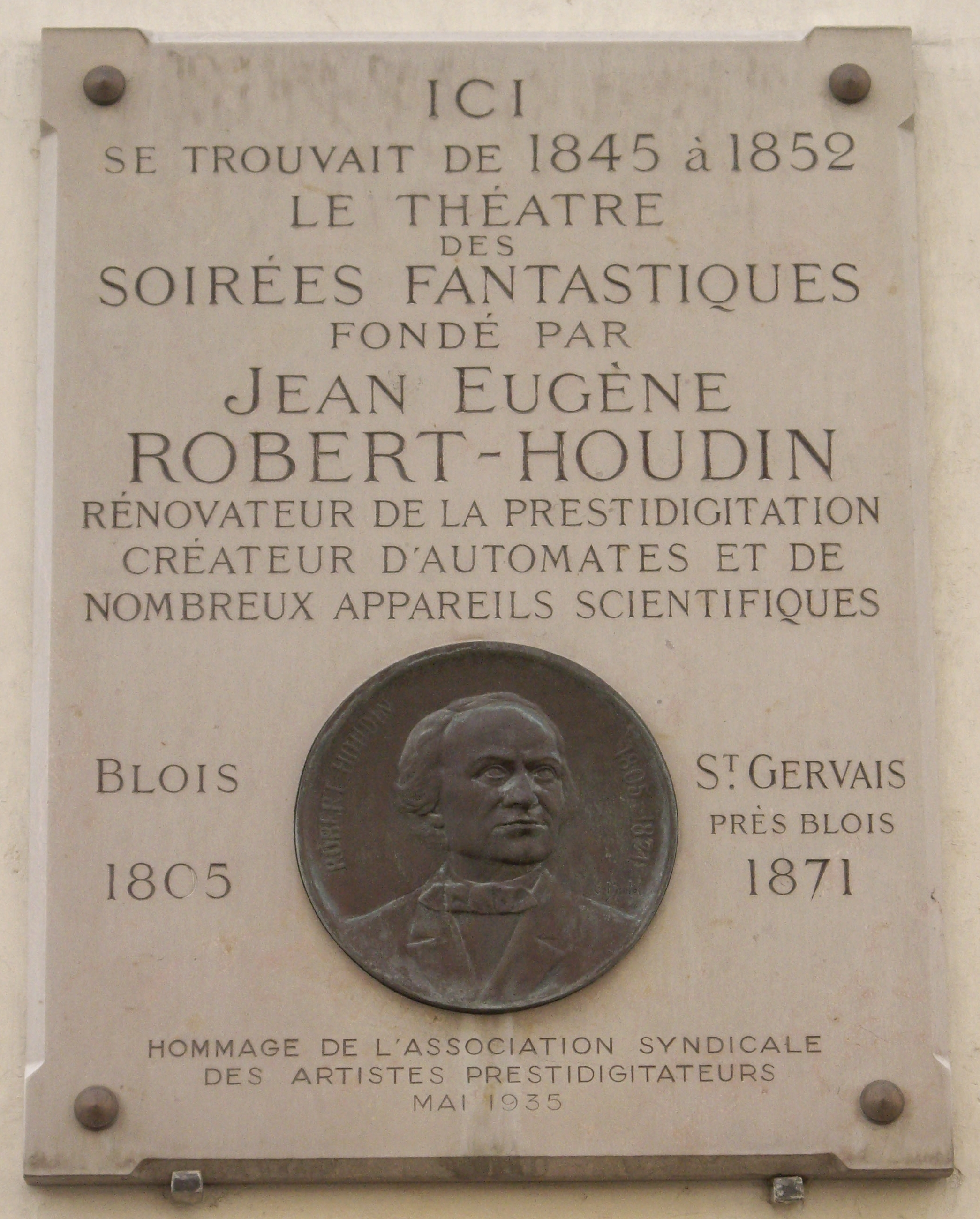
Commemorative plaque, 11 rue de Valois in Paris, where one could experience the Soirées fantastiques of Robert-Houdin

== Publications ==
- Confidences d'un prestidigitateur, une vie d'artiste, 2 vol., 1858 Texte en ligne sur Google Books : vol. 1 et vol. 2
- Les Tricheries des Grecs dévoilées; l'art de gagner à tous les jeux, 1861
- Le Prieuré, organisations mystérieuses pour le confort et l'agrément d'une demeure, 1867 Texte en ligne su Gallica
- Note sur de nouveaux instruments propres à l'observation des divers organes de l'œil ainsi qu'à la manifestation des images entoptiques, 1867
- Confidences et révélations, 1868. Réédition: Slatkine, Genève, 1980 Texte en ligne sur Gallica
- Comment on devient sorcier: les secrets de la prestidigitation et de la magie, 1871
- Magie et physique amusante, 1877

== Films and television ==
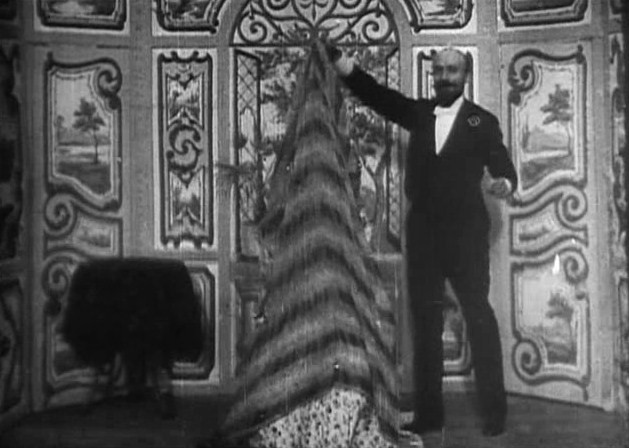
Escamotage d'une dame au théâtre Robert Houdin

- 1896: Escamotage d'une dame chez Robert-Houdin ("Retraction of a Lady at the House of Robert-Houdin"), film of Georges Méliès, first film with special effects
- 1995: Robert-Houdin une vie de magicien, film of Jean-Luc Muller, documentary
- 2006: The Illusionist (2006 film), in which the title character performs some of Robert-Houdin's signature tricks
- 2011: Hugo, features an automaton, reenactments of Houdin's illusions, and information about how he inspired Méliès.
- 2013: Mysteries at the Museum, Travel Channel television program, featured the story of Robert-Houdin's Algerian mission and the role of the wooden chest now on display at the Salon de Magie. Portrayed by American actor Paul Meltzer.

== See also ==
- List of magic museums
