= Peeping Tom (1897 film) =

1897 American short comedy-drama film

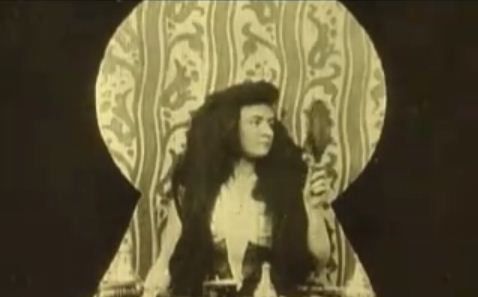
A frame not from Peeping Tom, but instead Par le trou de la serrure (What is Seen Through the Keyhole)

Peeping Tom is an 1897 American short comedy-drama film. The film was made by the American Mutoscope Company. It concerns a man peeping through a keyhole at an attractive young woman and his comeuppance.

This film is frequently confused online with the 1901 film Par le trou de la serrure (What is Seen Through the Keyhole), directed by Ferdinand Zecca.

== See also ==
- What the Butler Saw (mutoscope)
