= List of Pathé films =

The following is a list of films either produced or distributed by the French film company Pathé. During the silent film era, the Pathé group produced and distributed more than 10,000 films.

== 1900s ==
- Histoire d'un crime (1901)
- The Law of Pardon (1906)
- Aladdin and His Wonder Lamp (1906)
- Moscow Clad in Snow (1909)
- Ukhar Kupets (1909), Moscow department
- Viy (1909), Moscow department

== 1910s ==
- Peter the Great (1910), Moscow department
- Abraham Lincoln's Clemency (1910), American department
- Princess Tarakanova (1910), Moscow department
- Germinal (1913)
- The Five Cents of Lavarede (1913)
- September Morn (1914)
- André Cornélis (1918)
- The Count of Monte Cristo (1918 serial)
- Marion Delorme (1918)
- Rose o' Paradise (1918), American distribution
- J'accuse (1919)
- The Little Cafe (1919)

== 1920s ==
- Quatre-vingt-treize (1920) based on Ninety-Three
- Wedding Night (1920)
- Blanchette (1921)
- The Three Masks (1921)
- The Agony of the Eagles (1922)
- King of the Camargue (1922)
- Lord Arthur Savile's Crime (1922)
- Back Stage (1923), American distribution
- The Blaireau Case (1923)
- Giants vs. Yanks (1923), American distribution
- Koenigsmark (1923)
- The Red Inn (1923)
- Vidocq (1923)
- Heart of an Actress (1924)
- The Heirs of Uncle James (1924)
- Mandrin (1924)
- My Uncle Benjamin (1924)
- Fanfan la Tulipe (1925)
- Jocaste (1925)
- Les Misérables (1925)
- Prince Charming (1925)
- Surcouf (1925)
- The Lady of Lebanon (1926)
- Mademoiselle Josette, My Woman (1926), French distribution
- The Marriage of Rosine (1926)
- Captain Rascasse (1927)
- The Chocolate Girl (1927)
- Colette the Unwanted (1927)
- Croquette (1927)
- The Five Cents of Lavarede (1927)
- The Loves of Casanova (1927)
- The Maid at the Palace (1927)
- Princess Masha (1927)
- Antoinette Sabrier (1928)
- Change of Heart (1928)
- In Old Stamboul (1928)
- Little Devil May Care (1928)
- Madonna of the Sleeping Cars (1928)
- Prince Jean (1928)
- Saint Joan the Maid (1929)
- Temptation (1929)
- The Three Masks (1929)
- The Woman and the Puppet (1929)

== 1940s ==
- At Your Command, Madame (1942)

== 1950s ==
- Hiroshima mon amour (France distribution only)

== 1980s ==
- The Apple (France distribution only)
- The Cook, the Thief, His Wife & Her Lover (France distribution only)
- Felix the Cat: The Movie (France distribution only)
- Halloween 4: The Return of Michael Myers (France distribution only)
- Halloween 5: The Revenge of Michael Myers (France distribution only)
- Highlander (France distribution only)
- Kickboxer (France distribution only)
- Pirates (France distribution only)
- Prom Night (France distribution only)
- Rambo III (France distribution only; produced by Carolco Pictures)
- Scanners (France distribution only)
- Sex, Lies, and Videotape (France distribution only)

== 1990s ==
- Asterix & Obelix Take On Caesar (UK and France distribution only; co-production with Canal+ and TF1)
- Austin Powers: International Man of Mystery (UK distribution only; produced by New Line Cinema)
- Basic Instinct (UK distribution only; produced by Carolco Pictures)
- The Blair Witch Project (UK distribution only)
- Bound (UK distribution only)
- Cliffhanger (UK distribution only; produced by Carolco Pictures)
- Cutthroat Island (UK distribution only; produced by Carolco Pictures and Metro-Goldwyn-Mayer)
- Dumb and Dumber (France and Swiss distribution only)
- The Fifth Element (UK distribution only; co-production with Gaumont)
- Freddy's Dead: The Final Nightmare (UK distribution only; co-production with New Line Cinema)
- Highlander II: The Quickening (France distribution only)
- Jacob's Ladder (UK distribution only; produced by Carolco Pictures)
- James and the Giant Peach (UK distribution only; co-production with Allied Filmmakers and Walt Disney Pictures)
- Jane Eyre (UK distribution only; co-production with Miramax Films)
- Jason Goes to Hell: The Final Friday (UK distribution only; co-production with New Line Cinema)
- Judge Dredd (UK distribution only; co-production with Hollywood Pictures)
- Little Indian, Big City (France distribution only)
- Lolita (co-production with Samuel Goldwyn Films)
- The Mask (France and Swiss distribution only; produced by New Line Cinema)
- No Escape (UK distribution only; produced by Savoy Pictures and Pacific Western
- Pi (UK distribution only)
- Pink Flamingos (France distribution only; co-production with New Line Cinema)
- The Player (UK distribution only; co-production with New Line Cinema)
- Ratcatcher (co-production with BBC Films)
- A River Runs Through It (UK distribution only)
- Rogue Trader (UK distribution only)
- Showgirls (international distribution only; co-production with Chargeurs, Carolco Pictures and United Artists)
- Soft Pedal (UK and France distribution only)
- Sleepy Hollow (UK, France and Swiss distribution only; co-production with Mandalay Entertainment)
- Stargate (UK distribution only; co-production with Carolco Pictures, Centropolis Entertainment, and Metro-Goldwyn-Mayer)
- Super Mario Bros. (France distribution only)
- Swingers (UK distribution only)
- Terminator 2: Judgment Day (UK distribution only; produced by Carolco Pictures and Lightstorm Entertainment)
- Topsy-Turvy (UK distribution only; co-production with Thin Man Films)
- Total Recall (UK distribution only; co-production with Carolco Pictures)
- Universal Soldier (UK distribution only; co-production with Carolco Pictures and Centropolis Entertainment)
- The Virgin Suicides (UK and France distribution only)
- Wagons East (UK distribution only; co-production with Carolco Pictures)
- White Squall (UK distribution only; co-production with Hollywood Pictures and Scott Free Productions)
- The Wind in the Willows (UK and France distribution only; co-production with Walt Disney Pictures, and Allied Filmmakers)
- Wrongfully Accused (France and Swiss distribution only; produced by Warner Bros., Constantin Film, and Morgan Creek Productions)

== 2000s ==
- The Abduction Club (UK distribution only)
- Adulthood (UK distribution only; co-production with the UK Film Council)
- The Air I Breathe (UK distribution only; produced by ThinkFilm)
- Alexander (France distribution only; produced by Constantin Film, Pinewood Studios, Intermedia, France 3 Cinema and Warner Bros. Pictures)
- Alone in the Dark (France distribution only; produced by Lionsgate Films, Brightlight Pictures, and Boll KG)
- American Pie (France and Swiss distribution only; produced by Summit Entertainment, Zide/Perry Productions and Universal Pictures)
- Around the World in 80 Days (France distribution only; produced by Walt Disney Pictures, Summit Entertainment, Walden Media, Spanknyce Films and Mostow/Lieberman Productions)
- Ask the Dust (UK distribution only; co-production with Paramount Vantage)
- Asterix & Obelix: Mission Cleopatra (UK and France distribution only; co-production with Canal+ and TF1)
- Asterix at the Olympic Games (UK and France distribution only; co-production with TF1 and Canal+)
- Bad Education (France distribution only)
- Bandits (France distribution only; co-production with Metro-Goldwyn-Mayer, Constantin Film and Hyde Park Entertainment)
- Be Kind Rewind (UK/Switzerland distribution only; produced by Focus Features and New Line Cinema)
- The Believer (UK distribution only; co-production with Fireworks Entertainment)
- Big Nothing (co-production with Ingenious Media)
- Black Book (France distribution only; co-production with Clockwork Pictures and Babelsberg Studio)
- Black Christmas (UK distribution only; co-production with Metro-Goldwyn-Mayer and the Weinstein Company)
- Blindness (UK and France distribution only)
- Bride and Prejudice (UK distribution only; co-production with Miramax Films)
- Broken Embraces (UK distribution only; co-production with Universal Pictures)
- Brotherhood of the Wolf (UK theatrical distribution only; produced by StudioCanal and Davis Films)
- Buffalo Soldiers (UK distribution only)
- Bulletproof Monk (UK distribution only; produced by Lakeshore Entertainment and Metro-Goldwyn-Mayer)
- Chéri (co-production with Bill Kenwright Films and UK Film Council)
- Chicken Run (European distribution only; co-production with DreamWorks Animation and Aardman Animations)
- The Chorus (UK and France distribution only)
- Christmas Carol: The Movie (UK distribution only; co-production with Illuminated Film Company)
- Company Man (UK and France distribution only; co-production with Intermedia Films)
- The Cottage (co-production with the UK Film Council)
- Crash (UK distribution only; produced by Lionsgate)
- The Descent (co-production with Celador Films)
- The Descent Part 2 (co-production with Celador Films and Warner Bros. Pictures)
- The Diving Bell and the Butterfly (France distribution only; co-production with France 3 Cinema)
- DOA: Dead or Alive (France distribution only; co-production with Constantin Film, Team Ninja, and Dimension Films)
- The Duchess (co-production with Paramount Vantage)
- Eastern Promises (UK distribution only; co-production with BBC Films)
- Eden Lake (co-production with The Weinstein Company)
- Enemy at the Gates (UK, France and Swiss distribution only) (co-production with Mandalay Pictures and Paramount Pictures)
- Evelyn (UK and France distribution only)
- Farce of the Penguins (produced by Permut Presentations and ThinkFilm)
- The Fox and the Child (UK distribution only; produced by Canal+ and France 3 Cinema)
- Gerry (UK distribution only)
- The Goods: Live Hard, Sell Hard (UK distribution only; produced by Paramount Vantage)
- Go West! A Lucky Luke Adventure (France distribution only; co-production with Xilam and Dargaud)
- Harrison's Flowers (UK distribution only; produced by StudioCanal)
- The Hole (UK, France and Swiss distribution only; co-production with Le Studio Canal+)
- Honest (UK distribution only)
- The Hottie and the Nottie (UK distribution only)
- House of the Dead (France distribution only; co-production with Lionsgate Films and Boll KG)
- Interstate 60 (UK distribution only; co-production with Fireworks Entertainment)
- Jeepers Creepers 2 (UK distribution only; co-production with United Artists and American Zoetrope)
- Kingdom of Heaven (France distribution only; co-production with 20th Century Fox, Scott Free Productions, Inside Track and Studio Babelsberg)
- Kiss of the Dragon (Swiss distribution only; produced by EuropaCorp and Canal+)
- K-PAX (UK distribution with FilmFour, Swiss distribution only; co-production with Lawrence Gordon Productions, Universal Pictures and Intermedia)
- Lost in Translation (France distribution only; produced by Focus Features)
- Love Labour's Lost (UK and France distribution only; co-production with Miramax, Shepperton Studios and Intermedia)
- The Magic Roundabout (UK and France distribution only; co-production with France 3 Cinema, and UK Film Council)
- Marie Antoinette (France distribution only; co-production with American Zoetrope and Columbia Pictures)
- Memento (UK and France distribution only; co-production with Summit Entertainment and Newmarket Films)
- Michael Clayton (UK distribution only; produced by Warner Bros. Pictures, Summit Entertainment, Samuels Media, Castle Rock Entertainment, Mirage Enterprises and Section Eight Productions)
- Millions
- Mission to Mars (France distribution only; co-production with Touchstone Pictures and Spyglass Entertainment)
- Mr. Accident (UK distribution only; co-production with United Artists and Serious Entertainment)
- Mr. Nobody (France distribution only; co-production with Wild Bunch Productions and Canal+)
- Mulholland Drive (UK theatrical distribution only; produced by StudioCanal)
- Pandorum (France distribution only; co-production with Constantin Film and Overture Films)
- Perfume: The Story of a Murderer (UK distribution only; produced by Constantin Film)
- The Pianist (UK theatrical distribution only)
- Rat Race (UK distribution only; produced by Fireworks Entertainment and Paramount Pictures)
- Rescue Dawn (UK distribution only; co-production with Metro-Goldwyn-Mayer)
- Resident Evil (UK distribution only; co-production with Constantin Film)
- The Score (UK, France and Swiss distribution only; co-production with Mandalay Entertainment)
- The Scouting Book for Boys (co-production with Film4 Productions and Celador Films)
- Silent Hill (UK distribution only; co-production with Davis Films, Konami, and Team Silent)
- Slumdog Millionaire (co-production with Celador Films, Film4 Productions, Warner Bros. Pictures and Fox Searchlight Pictures)
- Son of the Mask (France distribution only; produced by New Line Cinema)
- Thunderpants (UK and France distribution only; co-production with CP Medien AG and Mission Pictures)
- Touching the Void (UK distribution only; co-production with IFC Films, Film4 Productions and the UK Film Council)
- Transamerica (UK distribution only; co-production with IFC Films and The Weinstein Company)
- Two Brothers (UK, France and Swiss distribution only; co-production with Universal Pictures and France 3 Cinema)
- The Walker (UK and France distribution only)
- What Just Happened (UK distribution only, produced by Magnolia Pictures)
- Wrong Turn (UK distribution only; co-production with Regency Enterprises, Constantin Film, and Summit Entertainment)
- Youth Without Youth (UK distribution only; co-production with American Zoetrope and Sony Pictures Classics)

== 2010s ==
- 127 Hours (UK and France distribution; co-production with Fox Searchlight Pictures, Dune Entertainment, Everest Entertainment, Film4 Productions, Darlow Smithson Productions, and Cloud 8 Films)
- Beauty and the Beast (France distribution only; co-production with TF1, Canal+, Ciné+ and Studio Babelsberg)
- The Bears' Famous Invasion of Sicily (France distribution only)
- Centurion (co-production with Celador)
- Enemy (studio credit only; co-production with Entertainment One, Corus Entertainment, Telefilm Canada and Roxbury Pictures)
- Florence Foster Jenkins (co-production with Paramount Pictures, BBC Films, Canal+, Ciné+ and Qwerty Films)
- The Illusionist (co-production with Canal+, France 3 Cinema, Django Films, Sony Pictures Classics)
- Jacky in Women's Kingdom (co-production with France 2 Cinéma, France Télévisions, Canal+, Ciné+ and Orange Studio)
- Jappeloup (co-production with Canal+, Ciné+, Orange Studio and TF1)
- Judy (co-production with BBC Films and Calamity Films)
- Julieta (co-production with El Deseo, RTVE, Canal+, Ciné+ and Echo Lake Entertainment)
- LOL (Original owner of the 2008 film; co-production with Lionsgate Films, Mandate Pictures and Double Feature Films)
- Mandela: Long Walk to Freedom (UK and France distribution only; co-production with Origin Pictures, Distant Horizon, Origin Pictures and Videovision Entertainment)
- No One Lives (co-production with WWE Studios and Anchor Bay Films)
- Oceans (France distribution only; co-production with Canal+, France 2 Cinema, France 3 Cinema and Participant Media, US and Canadian distribution is Disneynature)
- Pain and Glory (France distribution only)
- Philomena (UK and France distribution only; co-production with BBC Films, Canal+, and Ciné+)
- Playmobil: The Movie (France distribution only; co-production with DMG Entertainment, Morgen Studios, ON Animation Studios, Little Dragon, 2.9 Film Holding Ltd. and Wild Bunch)
- Pride (co-production with CBS Films, BBC Films, British Film Institute, Canal+ and Ciné+)
- The Prophet (France distribution only; co-production with Doha Film Institute and Participant Media)
- Rush (France distribution only; produced by Imagine Entertainment, Revolution Media, Working Title Films, Exclusive Media and Cross Creek Pictures)
- Savages (France distribution only; co-production with Relativity Media and Universal Pictures)
- Selma (co-production with Harpo Films, Paramount Pictures and Celador Films)
- Silent Hill: Revelation (UK and France distribution; co-production with Davis Films, Konami, and Team Silent)
- Suffragette (UK and France distribution only; co-production with Film4 Productions, Canal+ and Ciné+)
- Titeuf (France distribution only; co-production with MoonScoop Group)
- Trance (UK and France distribution only; co-production with Fox Searchlight Pictures, Film4 Productions and Indian Paintbrush)
- Twixt (co-production with American Zoetrope)
- A United Kingdom (co-production with BBC Films, Ingenious Media and British Film Institute)
- Viceroy's House (co-production with BBC Films, British Film Institute, Reliance Entertainment and Ingenious Media)
- Why I Did (Not) Eat My Father (France distribution)
- Zarafa (France distribution only; co-production with France 3 Cinema)

== 2020s ==
=== French ===
- Benedetta
- CODA
- Leave One Day
- Mon Cousin
- Le Meilleur Reste à Venir
- One Piece Film: Red
- The Count of Monte Cristo
- The Three Musketeers: D'Artagnan
- The Three Musketeers: Milady

=== British ===
- Allelujah (co-production with Ingenious Media, BBC Film, DJ Films and Redstart Media)
- The Great Escaper (co-production with BBC Film, Ecosse Films, Film i Väst and Filmgate Films)
- Strange Way of Life (UK distribution only)
