= À la conquête de l'air =

1901 French film by Ferdinand Zecca

À la conquête de l'air (Conquering the Air)
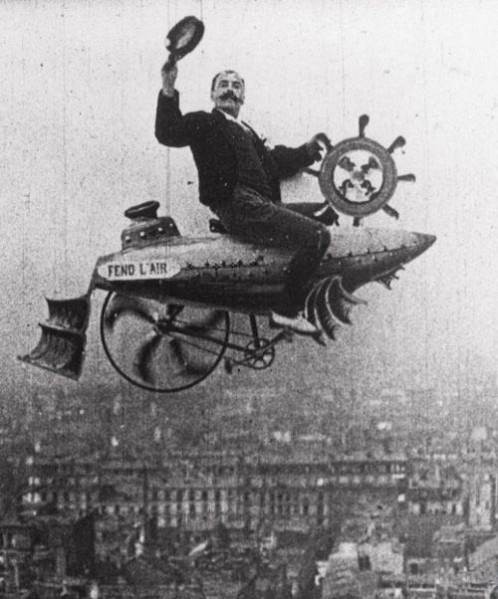
- A cropped still from Ferdinand Zecca's À la conquête de l’air
- Directed by: Ferdinand Zecca
- Starring: Ferdinand Zecca
- Production company: Pathé Frères
- Distributed by: Pathé Company
- Release date: 1901
- Running time: Approximately one minute
- Country: France
- Language: Silent

À la conquête de l'air (Conquering the Air) is a 1901 French silent film directed by Ferdinand Zecca and distributed by Pathé Frères. Based on contemporary accounts of aviation developments, À la conquête de l'air stars Ferdinand Zecca as the pilot of a fantastic flying machine. Aviation film historian Michael Paris considered the film, the first French aviation film and among the first to feature an aircraft in flight.

Zecca was hired by company founder Charles Pathé to invigorate the pioneering cinema company that had mainly been involved in documentary film. With an emphasis on new topics, Zecca expanded into short films that explored everything from everyday events to fantastic flight of fancy. His other films included comedies, trick films, or fairy tales, such as Les Sept châteaux du Diable, both 1901, and La Belle au bois dormant in 1902, as well as social dramas like Les Victimes de l'alcoolisme (1902), Au pays noir (1905) and reconstructions of actual events, the most famous being La Catastrophe de la Martinique (1902).

== Plot ==
In 1901, a strange flying machine, called Fend-l'air, was seen flying over the rooftops of Belleville.

== Cast ==
- Ferdinand Zecca as the pilot

== Production ==
Zecca had filmed himself in the strange contraption suspended from the studio roof with the camera having half the frame blocked. The film was then rewound and the Belleville, Paris city landscape was shot in the previously blacked-out portion, creating the first split-screen effect. The entire film only has a running time of approximately one minute.
