= The Hen That Laid the Golden Eggs =

1905 French silent short film

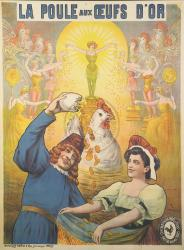
- French film poster
- French: La poule aux œufs d'or
- Directed by: Gaston Velle
- Production company: Pathé Frères
- Distributed by: Pathé Company
- Release date: 1905
- Running time: 14 minutes
- Country: France

The Hen That Laid the Golden Eggs (French: La poule aux œufs d'or), also known as The Hen with the Golden Eggs, is a 1905 French silent trick film directed by Gaston Velle. The film is inspired by the eponymous fable by Jean de La Fontaine, itself based on Aesop's fable The Goose that Laid the Golden Eggs.

== Plot ==
The Hen That Laid the Golden Eggs (1905)

The action takes place in the Middle Ages. On a market place, among a crowd of showmen, soldiers, countrymen, ladies and gentlemen, two adventurers are cutting the well-filled pockets of the onlookers. The crowd heads towards the hut of a magician who proves his skill by making a boy disappear. Then he puts a superb white hen into a lottery. The crowd fights over the numbers, the wheel turns and the lucky winner take the bird away.

In a barnyard, a peasant woman is taking care of the farm. Her husband comes back from the city and triumphantly shows her the hen that he himself places it carefully in the henhouse. The woman enters the henhouse to examine the white hen's nest where she finds a gigantic golden egg. She quickly tells her husband about her strange discovery. In the henhouse, the white hen, who is actually a fairy, jumps to the ground and turns into a person. At a sign from her, the other hens turn into women. Then the henhouse changes into a magnificent palace where the personified hens perform a graceful ballet until a huge basket of golden eggs appears. The henhouse suddenly returns to its original form and the dancers become hens again when the farmer and his wife return. They look at the huge, shiny eggs in amazement. The farmer breaks one of them and gold is dripping from it. The two peasants make a bountiful harvest of the magic eggs and go out to count their wealth. In the barnyard the two adventurers seen in the first scene enter and snatch a rabbit. The two peasants come out of the henhouse and while the woman jealously clutches her gold, the peasant threatens the thieves, who bow out and leave, but not without noticing the golden eggs.

The two peasants have become immensely rich and live in a sumptuous palace. A magnificent cage is installed in honour of the benefactor hen. Before going to bed, they admire it and stroke it. During the night, the two adventurers enter by climbing the balcony. They see the mysterious cage, discover the eggs and break one of them. The evil genie that was hiding there emerges in the form of a bat. Overcoming their fear, they examine another egg and see through the shell the sardonic head of Satan, spitting gold. They throw away the bewitched egg, which disappears in a cloud of smoke. At this moment they hear the peasant coming back and hide behind two armours. The master of the house opens a secret trap door and enters the underground cellar. He plunges his hands avidly into the accumulated gold and visions appear to him. On the wall, huge eyes roll menacingly in their sockets and gigantic hands seem to want to take away his property. Finally, the visions disappear and the peasant returns to his room. The two thieves come out of their hiding place, and steal the treasure. At dawn, the farmer and his wife recoil in horror when they see the door of the underground open and the gold gone. The farmer runs to the cage but no egg has been laid. He arms himself with a cutlass and, despite his wife's urging, goes to a small room in the castle to kill the hen.

As he hesitates to kill it, Satan appears and convinces him. Once the hen is dead, th peasant searches the entrails of the animal where he finds only one last egg. He violently throws the egg against the ground to break it and the fairy Misery appears. She tears his clothes to shreds and chases him away. The scene changes to the palace of the hen that lays the golden eggs. The peasant rises in a fairy tale setting, where, among gigantic eggs, fantastic roosters spread their wings. He is chased away by the fairy hen and by the others fairies who emerge from the enchanted eggs. The gold fairy appears, unfurling her cloak, from which gold flows everywhere.

== Production and reception ==
The film was directed by Gaston Velle on a scenario, inspired by Jean de La Fontaine's eponymous fable, by Segundo de Chomón, who was also responsible for the cinematography. It was released in December 1905 in France, Denmark and United States. On 4 February 1906, the Journal d'Indre et Loire wrote: "La Poule aux œufs d'or (The Hen with the Golden Eggs), the magnificence of which particularly amazed the public as much by the interest of the scenario as by the ingenuity of a staging that the best engineered and most modern theatres would not disavow."

== Analysis ==
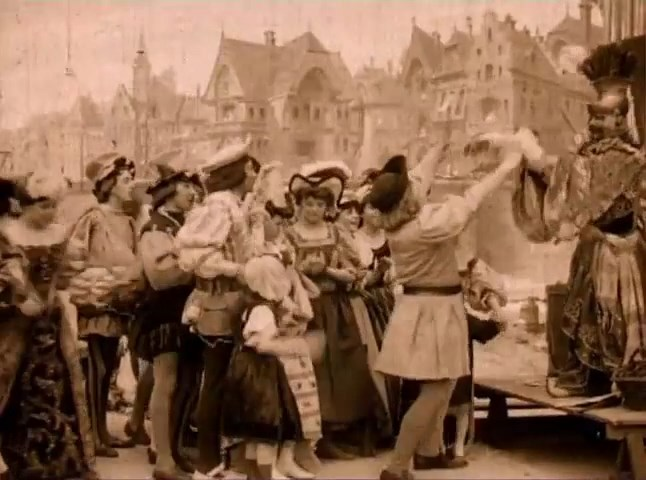
Shot 2

After a brief close-up as opening shot, the film is composed of four parts introduced by intertitles, comprising 12 wide shots and one close-up.

1. Opening shot: Close-up of a hen hatching golden eggs.

Scene 1: The Conjurer's Lottery.

2. A stage set representing a mediaeval city with a crowd of people in front of the city gate. A couple of thieves are robbing people. The camera pans right to a stage where a magician is performing tricks. He then puts a white hen into a lottery. The wheel turns and the lucky winner take the bird away. The camera pans left to follow him as he walks towards the city gate and exits.

Scene 2: The Fantastic Henhouse

3. A barnyard with a farmer woman taking care of the chickens. Her husband enters and shows her the hen he has won. The man opens the door of the henhouse to the right where he places the hen before leaving. The woman enters the henhouse.

4. Interior of a henhouse with the hen in the middle. The woman enters left. She discovers with wonder a huge golden egg under the hen and exits left. Once she has left, the hen turns into a young girl who transforms the other hens also in girls.

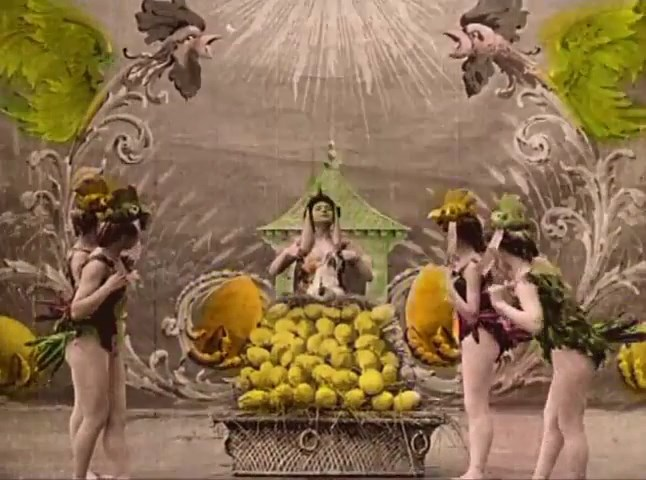
Shot 5

5. The stage set is replaced by a magical landscape where the girls dance and large pile of golden eggs appear.

6. Same set as 4, with the pile of golden eggs in the middle. The farmer and his wife enter and discover with wonder that the eggs are full of coins. The man kisses the hen and they exit left with her.

7. Same set as 3. The two thieves enter and steal a rabbit. The farmers come out of the henhouse and chase them away.

Scene 3: Ephemeral Fortune

8. Stage set representing a room in a palace with two suits of armour on each side of a French window and the hen in a golden cage to the right. The farmers, now richly dressed, enter through the French window. The man takes the hen out of the cage and both stroke her. After they have put the hen back in her cage, they both exit through a door to the right. The two thieves enter through the French window and find a golden egg under the hen. When they break it, its turns into a bat who flies away. They take another egg and observe it.

9. Close-up of the egg with, appearing in double exposure, the head of the devil, spitting coins and rolling his eyes.

10. Same set as 9. The thief throws on the ground the egg, which explodes. The thieves hide behind the armour and the farmer enters right. He takes a golden egg under the hen and opens a hatch in the floor. He walks down the stairs, observed by the thieves.

11. A subterranean room. The farmer comes down some stairs to the right and breaks the egg open, revealing the coins inside. Visions of eyes and arms appear in double exposure. He kisses his gold and exits up the stairs.

12. Same set as 9. The farmer comes up the stairs, closes the trap door and exits right. When he has left, the thieves steal all the gold and exit through the French door. The landscape behind the French window shows that morning has arrived. The farmers enter right and see through the open trapdoor that their gold has disappeared. Traders come in and present their bills. When they have left, the farmer sees that the hen has not laid a new egg. He grabs a cutlass and the hen and despite his wife's protests, exits through the French window.

Scene 4: The Miser's Punishment. Apotheosis

13. A small room with a window to the left and straw on the ground. The farmer enters right, holding the cutlass and the hen. He hesitates to strike her but the devil appears and makes an imperious sign before disappearing. The farmer strikes the hen (jump cut) and finds an egg inside. When he breaks it, an old hag appears, curses him and turns his clothes into rags.

14. The set of the room is replaced by a magical room with a huge golden egg in the middle and several smaller ones on the sides. Beautiful girls come out of the eggs and carry him away. The golden egg is replaced by the gold fairy who unfurls her cloak from which gold flows everywhere.
