= Burglars at Work =

1904 film by Gaston Velle

- French: Les Dévaliseurs nocturnes
- Directed by: Gaston Velle
- Release date: 1904
- Running time: 3 minutes
- Country: France
- Language: Silent

Burglars at Work (French: Les Dévaliseurs nocturnes) is a 1904 French comic scene film directed by Gaston Velle for Pathé Frères Film Company. Segundo de Chomón is cited as the artistic director for this film by the Jérôme Seydoux-Pathé Foundation, although Chomón did not move to Paris until 1905 and worked primarily as a color specialist.

== Plot ==
Burglars at Work

A man returns home from work and counts his money before retiring to bed. On his rooftop, we see the silhouette of two thieves using a rope to descend into an attic full of rats. The ruckus awakens the man, who takes his bicycle to go alert the police. While he is away, the thieves manage to descend into his room and steal his belongings and money, placing them in a sack. As the man is returning with a policeman, the thieves escape through the window, stealing his bicycle as well. In the 1908 remake, there is a chase scene at the end where the thieves are eventually caught.

== Optical Effects ==
The optical effects used in the film include tinting and shadow play. In The Ciné Goes to Town, Richard Abel describes Gaston Velle's trick films produced between 1904 and 1905 for the Pathé Frères Film Company as using a large variety of trick effects while maintaining focus on a single cinematic device. Another film by Gaston Velle that utilizes silhouettes is The Invisibles (French: Les Invisibles).

== 1908 Remake ==
A longer version of this film appeared on YouTube with a CNC watermark, leading to speculation about the film's release year and creator. The uploaded title offers a modified story with a final chase scene where the thieves are apprehended. Instead of Burglars at Work (French: Les Dévaliseurs nocturnes), this version is titled Nocturnal Thieves (French: Les Voleurs noctambules). Velle did not create this 1908 expanded remake, and its director is still unidentified.
