= Rêve à la lune =

1905 French silent short film

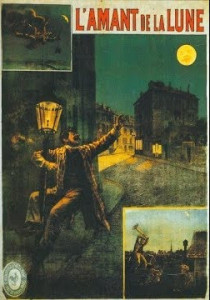
- Poster with the alternative title "L'amant de la lune"
- Directed by: Ferdinand Zecca, Gaston Velle
- Starring: Ferdinand Zecca
- Cinematography: Gaston Velle
- Production company: Pathé Frères
- Distributed by: Pathé Company
- Release date: 1905
- Running time: 6 minutes
- Country: France

Rêve à la lune, also known as L'Amant de la lune, is a 1905 French silent short film directed by Ferdinand Zecca and Gaston Velle, and distributed in English-speaking countries under the titles Dream of the Moon (World-wide, English title), The Moon Lover (United States) and Drunkard's Dream or Why You Sign the Pledge (United Kingdom). The film depicts a drunkard dreaming he is taken to the Moon.

== Plot ==
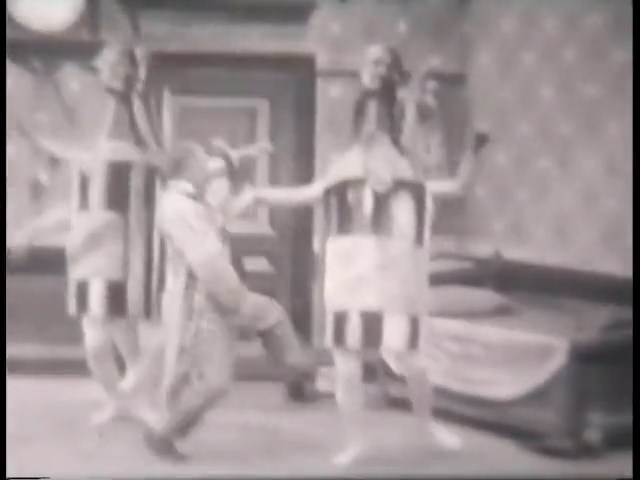
Dancing with the bottles

A drunkard staggers home and is prey to bizarre hallucinations. He first sees himself surrounded by gigantic bottles with human forms with which he executes a frenzied quadrille, then he falls asleep on his bed. While he sleeps, he believes himself on a public square, under the benevolent glance of the Moon of which he is immediately enamored. He wants to reach it and to this end, climbs on a gas streetlight, but the Moon is still too far away. He climbs the wall of a neighboring house and reaches the roof of the house on which he has much trouble to maintain his balance, he even falls through a skylight and puts in commotion all the tenants. Still wanting to catch the Moon, he hangs on to the pipe of a chimney that wobbles under his weight. Suddenly a hurricane rises and carries our man into space, still straddling the pipe he has not abandoned; he thus crosses miles through the clouds, while the storm rages around him. Once in the ethereal zones, ready to reach the object of his covetousness, the Moon itself moved by his efforts approaches him and grants him hospitality. He enters resolutely the Moon's mouth. But the Moon does not seem to share the enthusiasm of its visitor, and after some grimaces of disgust, it spits him out in the vacuum and he tumbles down with a vertiginous speed to fall finally in his bed, where he wakes up all bewildered by his strange nightmare.

Rêve à la lune (1905)

== Cast ==
- Ferdinand Zecca as the drunkard

== Analysis ==
The film is composed of 14 shots without any intertitles.

1. A Staircase. A drunken man has difficulties crossing another man in the staircase and trying to open his door.

2. Close up of a hand trying to put a key in the lock.

3. A room with a table with a bottle on it, a large clock on the wall, a coat hanger and a bed. The man comes in tries to take the bottle which moves away before turning into a humanoid bottle which multiplies. The man dances with them and when they disappear he falls asleep on his bed.

4. Cross-fade: the scene changes to a street at night, the bed turns into a bench and the clock into the Moon. The man wakes up and throws a bottle at the full moon. As a result, only a crescent of it is left. He climbs on a lamp post and catches the facade of a building.

5. The facade of a house. The man climbs the facade and reaches the roof. This special effect uses a tracking shot with a camera filming a horizontal set from above.

6. The roof of a house with various roofs in the background. The man tries to walk on the roof and wakes up various people who shout at him. He catches a chimney to keep his balance. The chimney takes off with a gust of wind and carries him into the air

7. Scrolling background of a landscape and double exposure of the man riding his chimney.

8. The flight continues amongst rain, clouds and lightning.

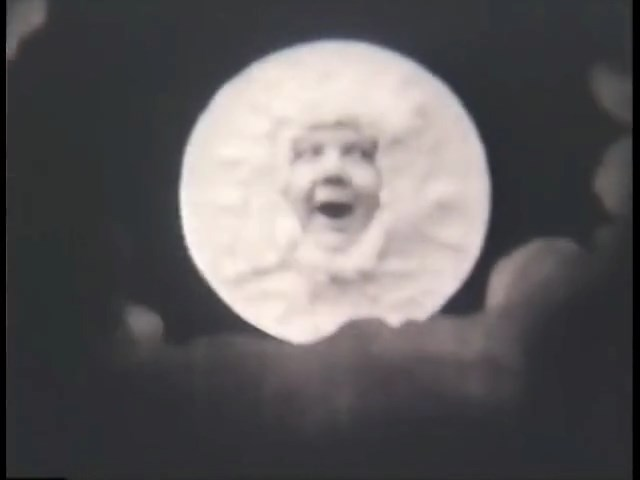
Reaching the Moon

9. The clouds open to show an approaching Moon shown as a smiling face which opens its mouth.

10. The face is replaced by a painted backdrop. The drunkard climbs on a ladder and disappears into the Moon's mouth.

11. Same as 9: The Moon figure makes funny faces.

12. Same as 10: The man is thrown out of the face, head first.

13. The man falls down head first in front of a scrolling backdrop of stars.

14. Same set as 3. The man falls on the ground. After throwing a bottle at the clock, he falls senseless on his bed.

== Versions ==
Two versions of the film print have been preserved; one of 112 meters, without a title card; and one of 128 meters, with a title card reading L'amant de la lune. Both versions include the same number of shots, but some shots in the second version are longer in duration. The cast is the same, but there are some differences in the drunkard's costume and some of the sets. Only shots 9 to 12 are identical in the two versions. A reasonable hypothesis for the existence of these two version seems to be that the original copy had been damaged from use, and given that screenings of the film were still in demand, a new shooting was organised. The change of title also raises some questions. Given that L'Amant de la lune [The Moon's lover] appears on the original film poster, while only Rêve à la lune [Dream of the Moon] appears in the Pathé catalogue, it seems likely that the former title was the original one and that it was eventually modified because of a sexual connotation regarded as unsuitable.
