= Drama in the Air =

1904 French silent short film

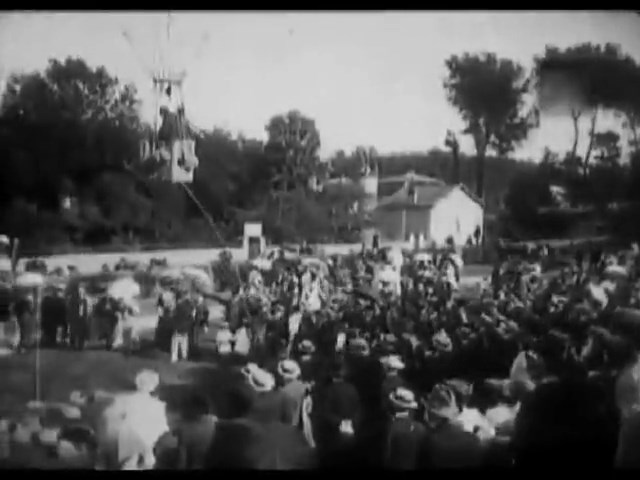
- French: Un drame dans les airs
- Directed by: Gaston Velle
- Cinematography: Gaston Velle
- Production company: Pathé Frères
- Distributed by: Pathé Company
- Release date: 1904
- Running time: Approximately 3 minutes
- Country: France

Drama in the Air, also known as Tragedy in Mid-Air, is a 1904 French silent short film directed by Gaston Velle and distributed in France by Pathé Frères. The original French title is Un drame dans les airs. It is loosely based on the novel A Drama in the Air by Jules Verne.

== Plot ==
A gas balloon with two passengers lifts up in front of a large crowd of people. A close-up of the balloon's basket shows the aeronauts saluting and observing through a telescope the city of Paris, some boats and a rocky shore. Suddenly a storm breaks out, a flash of lightning sets fire to the balloon which falls into the sea. The passengers clinging to the basket are rescued by a man in a rowing boat.

== Distribution ==
Un drame dans les airs was distributed by Pathé Frères in 1904 in France, Italy and, under the title Drama in the Air, in the United States, where it was also distributed by the Kleine Optical Company, the Edison Manufacturing Company, and the Lubin Manufacturing Company. The film was also distributed in the United Kingdom under the title Tragedy in Mid-Air.

== Analysis ==
The programme for the Première of the film in Verdun on 27 August 1904 indicated as follows the titles of the 8 scenes: 1. Ballasting the Balloon. 2. The Departure. 3. In the air. 4. What is seen from the basket. 5. Terrible storm. 6. Lightning ignites the gas in the balloon. 7. Terrible fall of the aeronauts on the open sea. 8. The rescue.

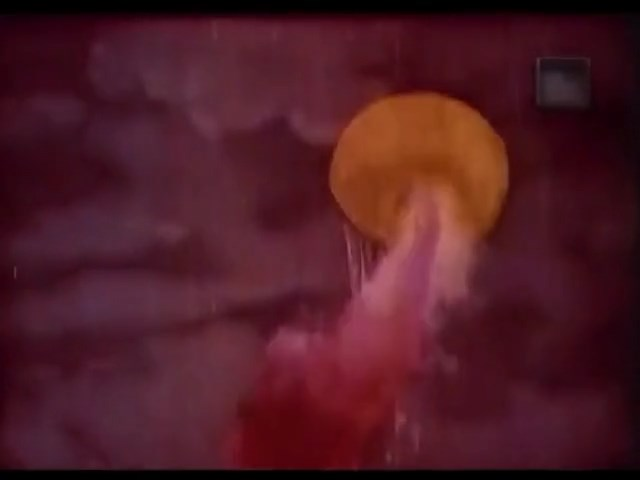
The balloon struck by lightning

Scenes 1 and 2 were shot on location and showed the real preparation and flight of a gas balloon. Scenes 3 and 4 alternated a studio shot of the balloon's basket in front of a painted backdrop figuring clouds with two men onboard looking through a telescope, and point of view iris shots showing what the aeronauts were watching: a panning shot of a city seen from a high point, a shot taken from a boat showing other boats on the sea and a shot of a rocky shore. Scene 5 consist of a studio shot of a balloon model in front of a panning background of clouds with added effects figuring rain and lightning. From 1:52, when the lightning hits the balloon, the film is hand coloured with the Pathécolor stencil process to show the balloon catching fire and exploding before falling. Scenes 6 and 7 consist of one shot filmed on location on a body of water and tinted blue.
