= Gaston Velle =

French silent film director and pioneer of special effects

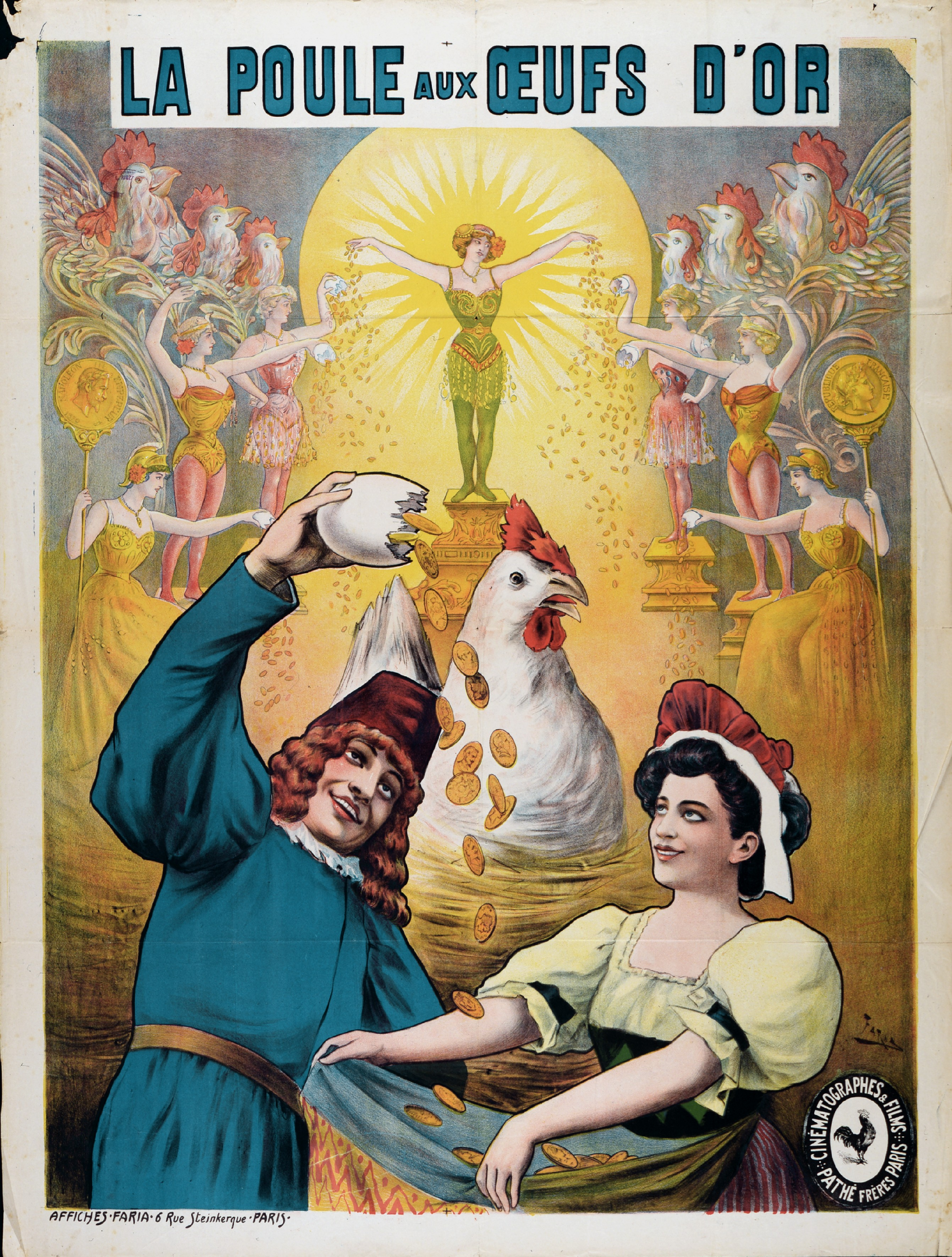
Poster by Faria for the film La poule aux oeufs d'or directed by Gaston Velle, 1905. Collection EYE Film Institute Netherlands.

Gaston Velle (1868–1953) was a French silent film director and pioneer of special effects, who was prominent in early French and Italian cinema during the first two decades of the 20th century. Like his father, the Hungarian entertainer Joseph "Professor" Velle, Gaston began his career as a travelling magician, before putting his illusionist skills to work in cinema and ultimately creating more than fifty films between 1903 and 1911. He worked under Auguste and Louis Lumière, before serving as the head of production for the Italian film studio Cines. But he is best remembered for his work at Pathé, where he was hired to produce trick films that might rival those of his contemporary, Georges Méliès, including classic shorts like Burglars at Work (1904). Some films pioneered lasting techniques, such as his Les Invisibles (1906) – the first known invisible man film.

Velle also created some of the first féerie films, such as tit-for-tat (1906). Additionally, Velle collaborated with other directors such as Segundo de Chomon and Ferdinand Zecca to create such silent film classics as the Moon Lover (1905), the Raja's Casket (1906), and the Hen that Laid the Golden Egg (1905), the latter of which was featured in the 1997 Martin Scorsese film, Kundun.

Velle mysteriously retired from film production in 1913, and little is known about the last several decades of his life. Still, Velle remained part of a prominent cinematic family. Most notably, his son Maurice Velle, a Parisian cinematographer, had a family with screenwriter Mary Murillo.

== Filmography ==
- 1904 – Dévaliseurs nocturnes
- 1904 – La danse du Kickapoo
- 1904 – Le paravent mystérieux
- 1904 – La danse des apaches
- 1904 – Danses plastiques
- 1904 – Les dénicheurs d'oiseaux
- 1904 – La métamorphose du papillon
- 1904 – Japonaiseries
- 1904 – La Valise de Barnum
- 1904 – Métamorphose du roi de pique
- 1904 – Un drame dans les airs
- 1904 – Le Chapeau magique
- 1905 – La poule aux œufs d'or
- 1905 – Sidney, le clown aux échasses
- 1905 – La fée aux fleurs
- 1905 – Rêve à la lune ou L'amant de la lune
- 1905 – Les cartes lumineuses ou Les cartes transparentes
- 1905 – Ruche merveilleuse
- 1905 – Coiffes et coiffures
- 1905 – John Higgins, le roi des sauteurs
- 1905 – L'antre infernal
- 1905 – Un drame en mer
- 1905 – L'аlbum merveilleux
- 1906 – Le Bazar du Père Noël (Il Bazar di Natale)
- 1906 – Onore rusticano
- 1906 – Il pompiere di servizio
- 1906 – Heures de la mondaine (Le ore di una mondana)
- 1906 – Enlèvement à bicyclette (Il ratto di una sposa in bicicletta)
- 1906 – Il dessert di Lulù
- 1906 – L'accordéon mysterieux (L'organetto misterioso)
- 1906 – Bicyclette présentée en liberté
- 1906 – Mariage tragique (Nozze tragiche)
- 1906 – Le garde fantôme
- 1906 – Les Invisibles
- 1906 – La Peine du talion
- 1906 – Les effets de la foudre
- 1906 – Cuore e patria
- 1906 – La fée aux pigeons
- 1906 – Quarante degrés à l'ombre (Quaranta gradi all'ombra)
- 1906 – Otello
- 1906 – Voyage autour d'une étoile
- 1906 – L'есrin du rajah
- 1906 – Les Fleurs animées
- 1907 – Petit Jules Verne
- 1907 – Le secret de l'horloger
- 1907 – Le petit prestidigitateur
- 1907 – Le secret de l'horloger (Patto infernale)
- 1907 – Au pays des songes (Nel paese dei sogni)
- 1907 – Artista e pasticciere
- 1907 – Gitane (La gitana)
- 1907 – Pile électrique (La pila elettrica)
- 1907 – Petit Frégoli (Il piccolo Fregoli)
- 1907 – Fille du chiffonnier (La figlia del cenciaiolo)
- 1907 – Primavera senza sole
- 1907 – Triste jeunesse (Triste giovinezza)
- 1907 – Un moderno Sansone
- 1907 – Le crime du magistrat (Il delitto del magistrato)
- 1908 – Après le bal (Dopo un veglione)
- 1908 – Lapins du docteur (I conigli del dottore)
- 1908 – Confession par téléphone (La confessione per telefono)
- 1908 – Première nuit de noces (La prima notte)
- 1908 – Polichinelle (Le avventure di Pulcinella)
- 1908 – Le spectre(Lo spettro)
- 1908 – Dîner providentiel (Pranzo provvidenziale)
- 1908 – Le triple rendez-vous(Triplice convegno)
- 1910 – Isis
- 1910 – Cagliostro, aventurier, chimiste et magicien
- 1910 – Au temps des Pharaons
- 1910 – La rose d'or
- 1910 – Le charme des fleurs
- 1910 – Le fruit défendu
- 1910 – L'oracle des demoiselles
- 1910 – Rêve d'art
- 1911 – Fafarifla ou le fifre magique
- 1911 – L'armure de feu
- 1911 – Le cauchemar de Pierrot
- 1913 – La nuit rouge
