= Excursion to the Moon =

Excursion dans la lune
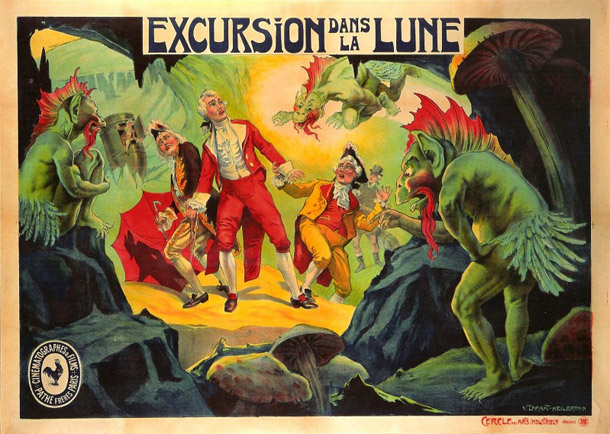
- Directed by: Segundo de Chomón
- Based on: A Trip to the Moon by Georges Méliès
- Produced by: Ferdinand Zecca
- Production company: Pathé Frères
- Release date: 1908
- Running time: 180 meters
- Country: France
- Language: Silent

Excursion to the Moon (French: Excursion dans la lune) is a 1908 French silent trick film directed by Segundo de Chomón. The production was supervised by Ferdinand Zecca, designed by V. Lorant-Heilbronn, and released by Pathé Frères. The film is an unauthorized remake, and an almost shot-by-shot copy, of Georges Méliès's 1902 film A Trip to the Moon.

The film follows Méliès's scenario closely and includes many of its features, with some variations: for example, the Selenites are not vulnerable to umbrellas, but rather appear and disappear at will; the capsule lands inside the Man in the Moon's open mouth rather than hitting its eye; and the Selenite who returns to Earth is a "dancing moon-maiden" who is betrothed at the end of the film to one of the astronomers. This film has occasionally been misidentified as a work by Méliès.

Of the film's 180 meters, 72 were colorized using a Pathé stencil process.

Excursion To The Moon (1908)
