= The Law of Pardon =

1906 French silent short film

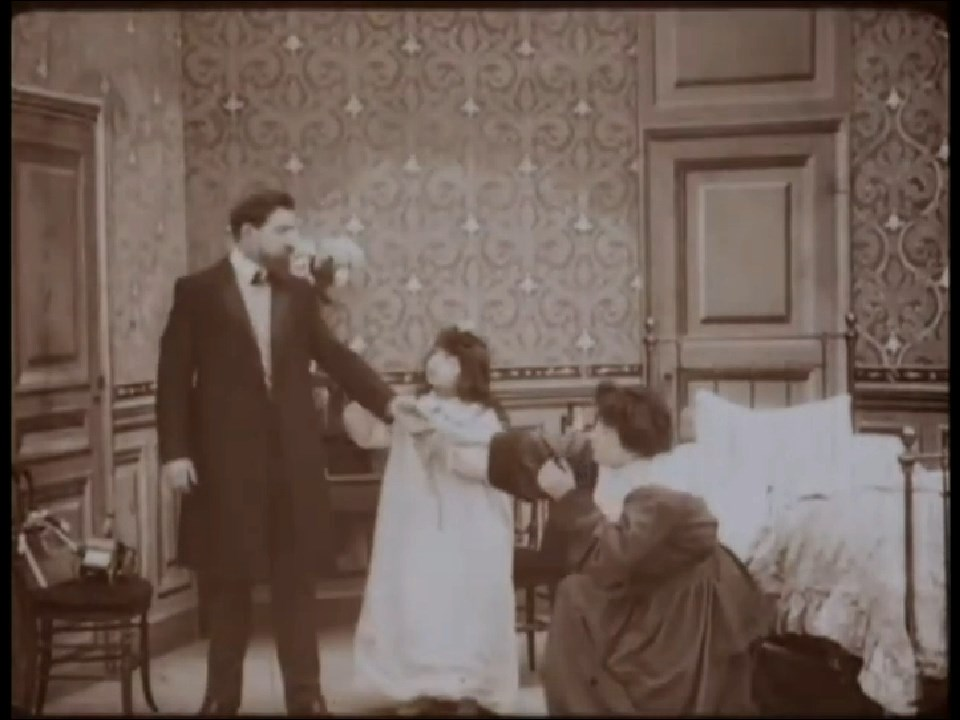
- French: La loi du pardon
- Directed by: Albert Capellani
- Written by: André Heuzé
- Production company: Pathé Frères
- Distributed by: Pathé Frères
- Release date: 1906
- Running time: 8 minutes
- Country: France

The Law of Pardon (French: La loi du pardon) is a 1906 French silent short film directed by Albert Capellani. It is a melodrama about a man divorcing his wife for adultery and getting custody of their child.

== Plot ==
A man has caught his wife writing a letter to her lover. He chases her away and obtains a divorce pronounced in his favour, with custody of their young daughter. Soon, however, the child cannot bear the absence of her mother. In spite of her father's care, she falls ill. The father sends for a sister to look after her. During the father's absence, the mother visits the little girl. The sister, pitying her distress, agrees to give her a costume, so she can stay near her. Unfortunately, when the father returns, he recognises her under her disguise and orders her to leave. However, when the girl rises from her bed and joins the hands of her father and mother with a smile, he does not have the heart to separate mother and daughter again.

== Production and release ==
The film was produced by Pathé Frères and directed by Albert Capellani, who was specialising in "realist dramas", on a scenario written by André Heuzé. It was partly filmed in Pathé's Vincennes studio and partly on location in Paris.

The film was released in April 1906 in France, in May 1906 in the United States, in July 1906 in Mexico, and in November 1906 in Brazil.

== Analysis ==
The film is composed of four scenes comprising eight shots with only one intertitle. The viewer understands from the context that a substantial amount of time has elapsed between scene 1 and 2, while probably only a few days separate the following scenes. Scenes 1 to 3 are single shot while scene 4 is composed of five shots with cross-cutting and continuity editing. Five of the shots are filmed indoors on three reasonably realistic decors, while three shots are outdoors, two in a street and one in a park.

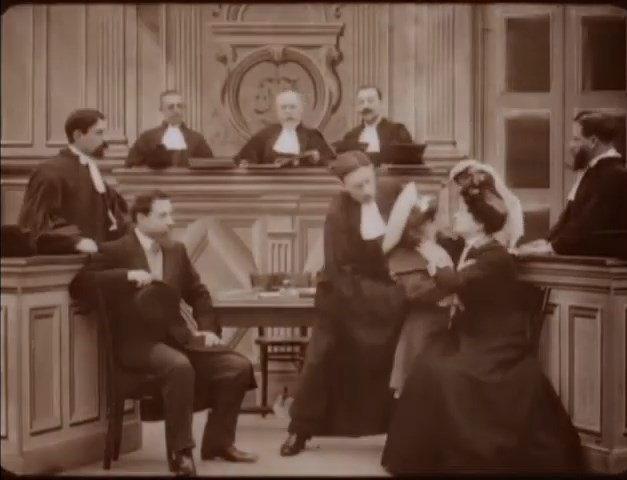
Scene 2

=== Scene 1. ===
Shot 1. Indoors. Full shot of a drawing room. A woman and a girl knitting. A servant brings a letter. The woman reads it with pleasure and starts immediately writing an answer. A man enters, takes the letter and signals to his wife that he is kicking her out despite the child's pleas.

Intertitle: La séparation [The Separation]

=== Scene 2. ===
Shot 2. Indoors. Full shot of a tribunal. The man and the woman, each with their lawyer are facing a court of three judges. The man refuses his wife's excuses. Their daughter is introduced. She rushes to kiss her mother but she is torn away from her and given to the father, who leaves the court with her.

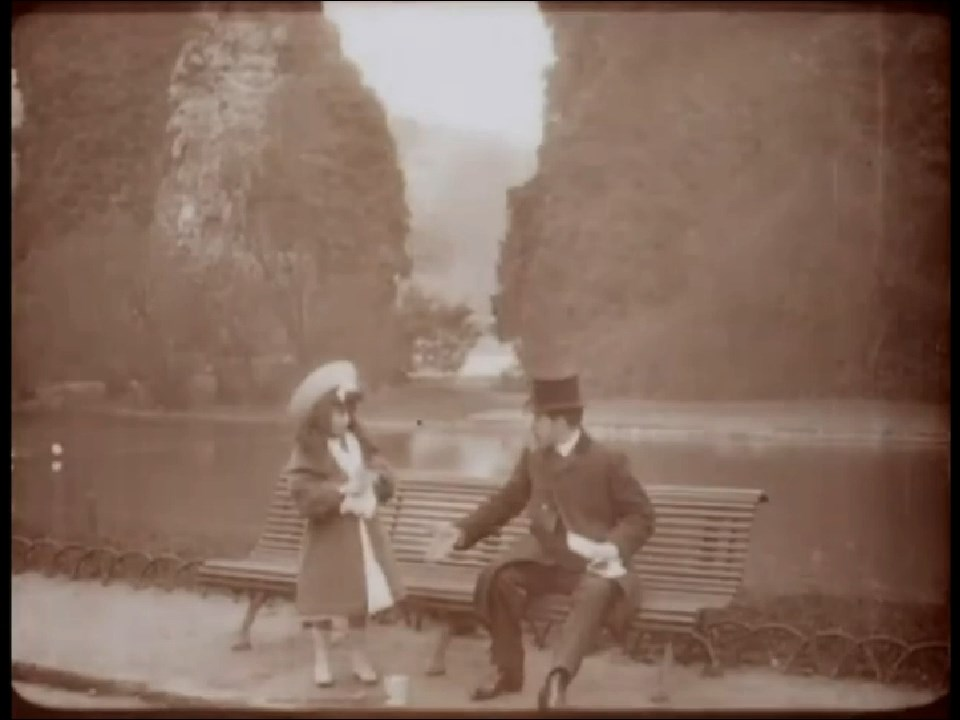
Scene 3

=== Scene 3. ===
Shot 3. Outdoors. Full shot park with a lake. The father is sitting on a bench while his daughter is playing, but soon she asks him to go back home.

=== Scene 4. ===
Shot 4. Indoors. Full shot of a bedroom. The girl is in bed, the father next to her. A sister is introduced. She kneels by the bed and pray.

Shot 5. Outdoors. Long shot of a street with stone buildings. The man comes out of a building and walk to the corner of the street where a carriage is waiting. As soon as he has turned the corner, the woman gets out of the carriage, walks towards the building and enters.

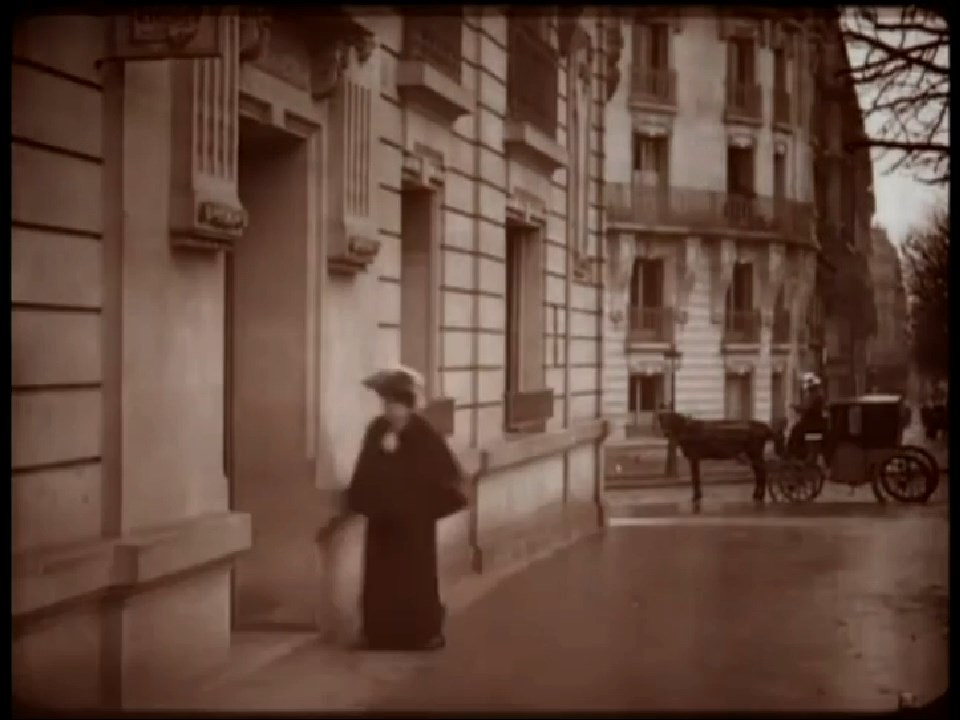
Scene 4, shot 5

Shot 6. Same decor as shot 4, the sister still kneeling by the bed. The mother enters and begs the sister. Reluctantly, she takes off her veil and gives it to the mother before leaving the room.

Shot 7. Full shot of the door of the building seen in shot 5. A man is sweeping the floor in front of the building. The father comes back carrying packages and talks to the concierge before entering the building.

Shot 8. Same decor as shot 4. The mother wearing the sister's veil comes in through the right-hand door and kneels by the bed. Her daughter hugs her. The father comes in through the other door. When he recognises the mother he wants to throw her out. She kneels at his feet but he remains inflexible. Finally his daughter comes out of her bed, takes his hand and joins it with her mother's. He lets the girl hug her mother.

The film was part of Pathé's series: Scènes dramatiques et réalistes [Dramatic and realistic scenes]

According to Jean Doucet and Gilles Nadeau, this is the first sentimental film ever shot. It was hailed by contemporary film director Victorin Jasset as "one of the first great films and one of the first commercial successes in the genre".
