= Charles Pathé =

French businessman

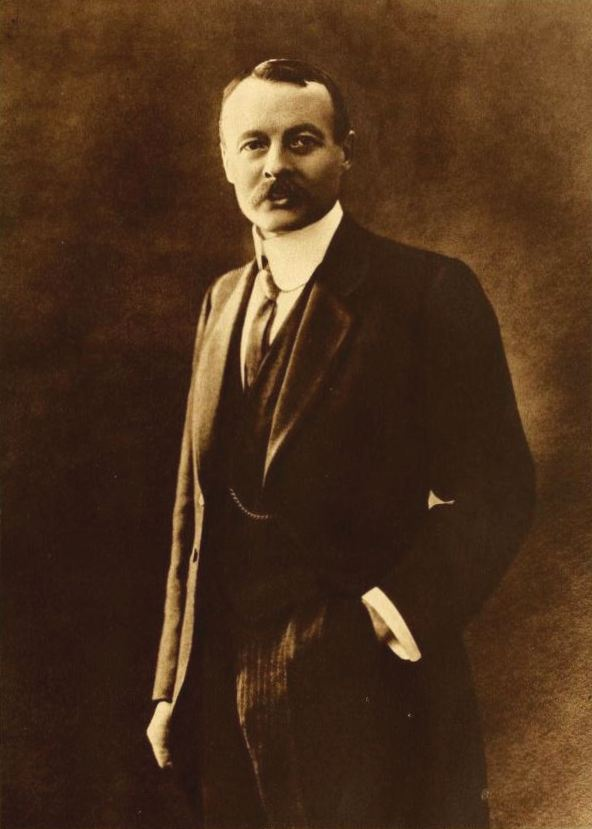
- Charles Pathé, June 1919
- Born: Charles Morand Pathé; 26 December 1863; Chevry-Cossigny, Seine-et-Marne, Second French Empire
- Died: 25 December 1957 (aged 93); Monaco
- Occupations: Film producer; Businessman
- Years active: 1889–1927
- Era: 20th century
- Known for: Filmmaking

Charles Morand Pathé (French: [pate]; 26 December 1863 – 25 December 1957) was a pioneer of the French film and recording industries. As the founder of Pathé Frères, its roots lie in 1896 Paris, France, when Pathé and his brothers pioneered the development of the moving image. Pathé adopted the national emblem of France, the cockerel, as the trademark for his company. The firm, as Compagnie Générale des Éstablissements Pathé Frères Phonographes & Cinématographes, invented the cinema newsreel with Pathé-Journal.

== Early life ==
The son of a butcher shop owner, Charles Morand Pathé was born at Chevry-Cossigny, in the Seine-et-Marne département of France. His father, Jacques Pathé and mother, Thérèse-Émélie Kech were butchers by trade, and ran a delicatessen first in Chevry-Cossigny, and later in Vincennes. Charles had three brothers and two sisters.

== Business ventures ==
Pathé left school at 14 to work as an apprentice butcher, at rue de Charenton, Paris. After military service, in 1889, at 25, he began working as a meat merchant but soon took his savings, and with the help of his brothers and his sister, embarked for Buenos Aires, Argentina, with the aim of setting up in business.

Pathé tried to establish himself in various trades including a laundry service based on industrial washing machines that turned out to be unsuccessful. His life was unsettled and Pathé was forced to change jobs frequently. After a final failure of trying to deal in exotic parrots, when he and his business partner were stricken with yellow fever, Pathé returned to France in poor health.

At age 30, Pathé married lle Foy in Paris, and worked as a clerk, drawing a meager salary.

== Sound recording ==
Back in Vincennes, in August 1894, Pathé saw the phonograph invented by Thomas Edison, demonstrated at the town fair. He immediately embraced the sound recording technology, purchasing examples of Edison machines to resell. In 1896, with his brothers Émile, Théophile and Jacques, Pathé founded Société Pathé Frères (Pathé Brothers) in Paris, a company that manufactured and sold phonographs and phonograph cylinders, with Émile Pathé at his head.

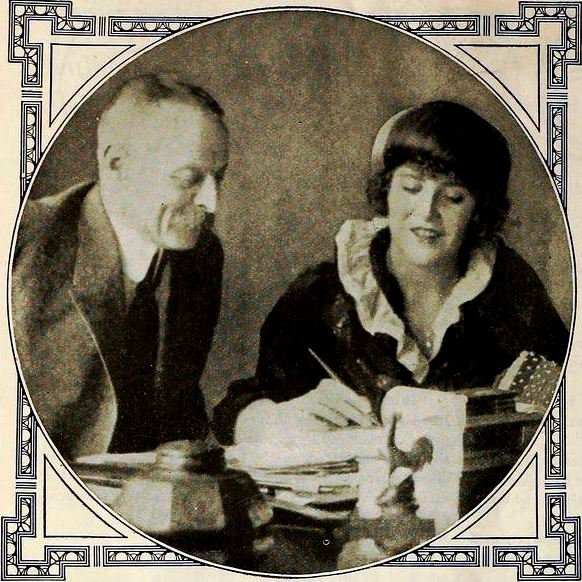
Charles Pathé and Ruth Roland at the signing of her contract in 1919

== Cinema ==
While in London, Pathé saw the Edison Kinetoscope and decided to expand the Pathé company's business to distributing cinema projection equipment, and with the acquisition of Eastman Kodak patent rights in Europe, a licence for film stock in theatres throughout France. Pathé films were rented out, for a maximum of four months, a more lucrative business than selling the product. A modest first factory had been installed in 1896 at Vincennes. The first films of the Société Pathé Frères such as Le Passage à niveau à Joinville le Pont and L'Arrivée d'un train en gare de Bel-Air were produced, under Pathé's guidance. For several years, however, the success of the phonograph business underwrote the success of the cinema company.

On 28 December 1897, Société Pathé Frères was re-capitalised and set up as a combination of production, film laboratories, technical services and distribution of films. From 1902 to 1904, Pathé opened branches in Europe and in the United States, with their trademark Gallic cock logo created in 1905, recognized as heralding one of the world's most significant filmmakers. In 1906, Pathé Frères began to establish a global enterprise with Segundo de Chomón founded the Spanish branch in Barcelona, and four years later Pathé entered the US market with Pathé-America, based in New Jersey, branch offices in other countries followed.

From its origin, Pathé Frères began using the camera developed by Lumière brothers' patents and then set about to design an improved studio camera and to make their own film stock. From 1901, Pathé teamed up with director and later manager Ferdinand Zecca who oversaw the creation and production of original Pathé Frères films. From 1905 on, the company employed specialized studio staff: screenwriters, directors, cinematographers and other technicians.

Zecca explored many themes from the mundane to the fantastic. In À la conquête de l'air (1901), a strange flying machine, called Fend-l'air, was seen flying over the rooftops of Belleville. By using trick photography, the one-minute short was notable in being the first aviation film, predating the flight by the Wright Brothers by two years. (Note: Zecca had filmed an actor in the strange contraption suspended from the studio roof with the camera having half the frame blocked. The film was then rewound and the city landscape was shot in the previously blacked-out portion, creating the first split-screen effect.)

Zecca also pioneered one of the first crime dramas, Histoire d'un crime (1901), stylistically innovative in its use of superimposition. The story was of a man condemned to death, awaiting execution with his crimes appearing on his cell wall. The film is an early example of flashbacks as a film device. Other films included comedies, trick films or fairy tales, such as Les Sept châteaux du Diable, both 1901, and La Belle au bois dormant in 1902, as well as social dramas like Les Victimes de l'alcoolisme (1902), Au pays noir (1905) and reconstructions of actual events, the most famous being La Catastrophe de la Martinique (1902).

Zecca acted in many of his films. At the end of 1906, assisted by the Spaniard Segundo de Chomón's photography and special effects, Zecca continued to experiment. He co-directed La Vie et la passion de Jésus Christ (1903), which, at a running time of 44 minutes, was one of the first feature-length films about Jesus. He started filming in colour, with second Vie et Passion de N.S. Jésus Christ, shot in four parts with 38 scenes, 990 metres long, which was finished in 1907.

Between 1900 and 1907, Zecca oversaw the production of hundreds of Pathé films from many important Pathé directors including Nonguet Lucien, Gaston Velle, Albert Capellani, Louis J. Gasnier, André Heuzé and Henri Pouctal. Zecca also acted, directed, produced, and, on occasion, wrote films. After Pathé bought the rights to Star films, Zecca started editing films by Georges Méliès. Film production went from 70 titles in 1901 to 500 in 1903; after 1906, the mass film production gradually eased as longer films were produced.

Pathé Frères filmed numerous short subjects, the majority of which are sensational criminal adventures, melodramatic love stories, and comedies. In 1909 Pathé produced his first feature or "long film," Les Misérables, a four-reel screen version of the novel by Victor Hugo. That same year he created the Pathé Gazette in France (called Pathé News in the U.S. set up in 1910 and in the U.K. (now British Pathé) in 1911), which was an internationally popular newsreel until 1956.

In 1912, Pathé appointed the director Alfred Machin to develop the first studio films at Karreveld Castle in Molenbeek-Saint-Jean, Belgium. In 1914, Pathé Frères studios in the United States released the first episodes of The Perils of Pauline, one of the earliest and best remembered screen serials. The company also began publishing the screen magazine Pathé Pictorial. When Pathé Exchange was spun off from its French parent company in 1921, with a controlling stake held by Merrill Lynch, Charles Pathé stayed on as a director of the American firm.

In 1929, Charles Pathé sold out his interest in his businesses and retired to Monaco. He died there on Christmas Day 1957, one day before his 94th birthday.
