= Histoire d'un crime (film) =

- Directed by: Ferdinand Zecca
- Starring: Jean Liézer
- Production company: Pathé Frères
- Distributed by: Pathé Company
- Release date: 1901
- Running time: Approximately 5 minutes
- Country: France
- Language: Silent

Histoire d'un crime is a 1901 French silent film directed by Ferdinand Zecca and distributed by Pathé Frères. The film stars Jean Liézer as the murderer and was based on a contemporary tableau series titled "L'histoire d'un crime" at the Musée Grévin.

Histoire d'un crime is considered the first crime film and among the first to use seedy, realistic settings. Film historian Don Fairservice has noted Histoire d'un crime was "very influential." Zecca had convinced Charles Pathé that other film subjects could supplement the Pathé documentaries. His other films included comedies, trick films, or fairy tales, such as Les Sept châteaux du Diable, both 1901, and La Belle au bois dormant in 1902, as well as social dramas like Les Victimes de l'alcoolisme (1902), Au pays noir (1905) and reconstructions of actual events, the most famous being La Catastrophe de la Martinique (1902).

Histoire d'un Crime is also considered the first film to feature a flashback.

== Plot ==
During a home invasion, a sleeping bank employee is awakened by a burglar. In the ensuing struggle, the burglar stabs the other man. The next day, the burglar, an out-of-work carpenter, is arrested at a café while spending lavishly on wine. He is put on trial and found guilty.

While the burglar is being held in prison, he sees a series of flashbacks on his cell wall, depicting him as an honest workman with a happy home life but he soon begins to drink heavily. Becoming a burglar, he descends further into crime, finally committing a murder.

As the day of execution arrives, the executioners cut his hair off and a priest performs an expiation. The burglar is led to the guillotine and is executed.

== Cast ==
- Jean Liézer as the murderer

== Production ==
Histoire d'un crime is stylistically innovative in its use of superimposition of images. The story was of a man condemned to death, awaiting execution with his crimes appearing on his cell wall. The film is also an early example of flashbacks as a film device. The realism that was portrayed led to the film being stopped before the final execution scene to allow women and children to leave the theatre. Later, French authorities censored the film and required that the scene be entirely removed.
