= Ferdinand Zecca =

French film director (1864–1947)

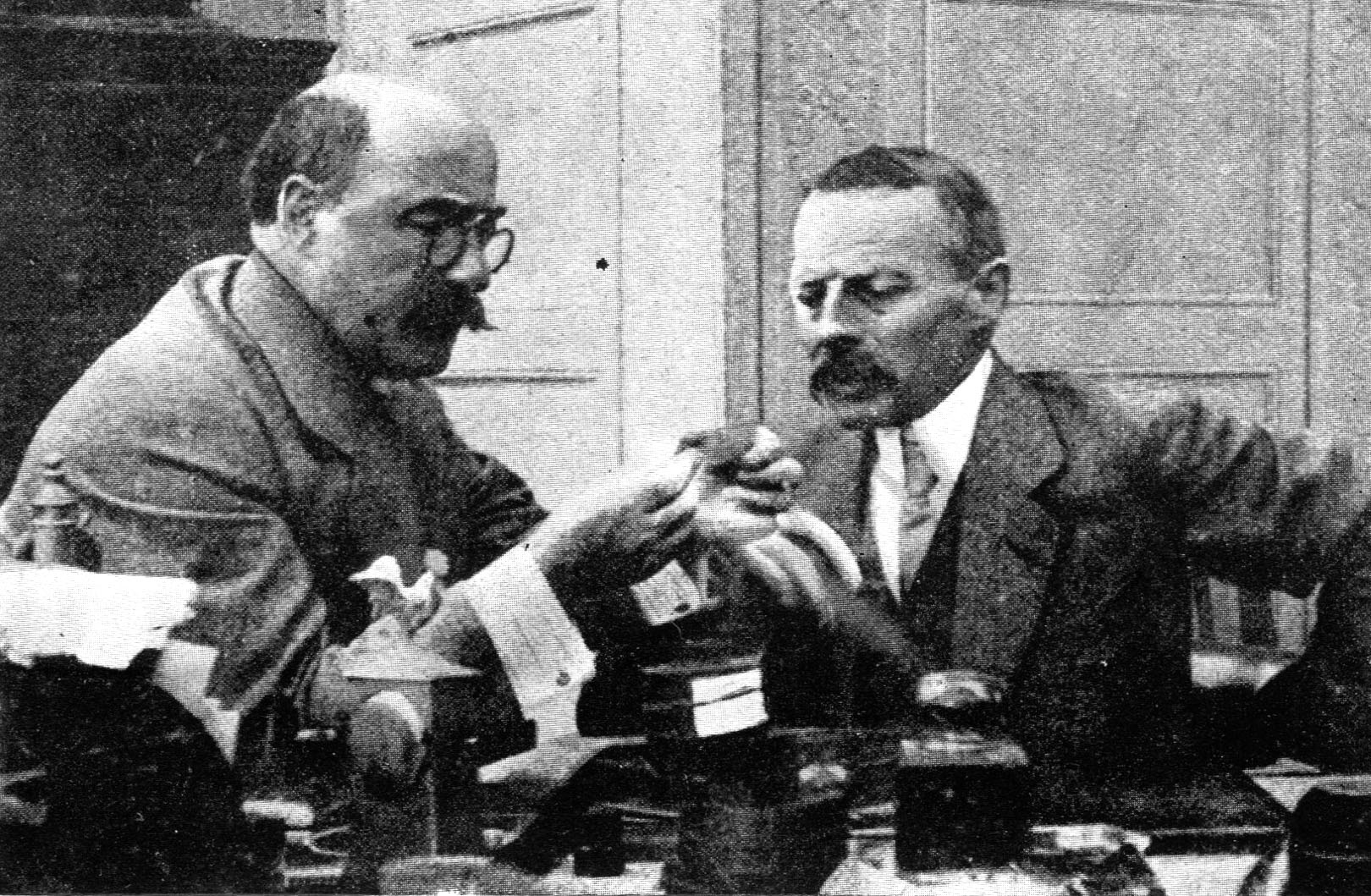
- the director Ferdinand Zecca with the producer Charles Pathé in 1909
- Born: Ferdinand Louis Zecca; 19 February 1864; Paris, France
- Died: 23 March 1947 (aged 83); Saint-Mandé, France
- Occupations: film director; producer; actor; screenwriter

Ferdinand Zecca (19 February 1864 – 23 March 1947) was a pioneer French film director, film producer, actor and screenwriter. He worked primarily for the Pathé company, first in artistic endeavors then in administration of the internationally based company.

== Early life ==
Ferdinand Louis Zecca was born in Paris on 19 February 1864 into an Italian family steeped in the entertainment world. His father was the stage manager at the Paris Théâtre de l'Ambigu while his brothers were actors. (Note: His brother, Louis Z. Rollini, later became a screenwriter with 23 credits to his name.) Zecca also became a stage manager and then an actor, before working as an entertainer, playing the cornet and singing in Parisian cafés. He was playing the cornet at the Foire au Pain d'épices, when he encountered filmmaker Léon Gaumont.

== Filmmaking ==
From 1891, Zecca had worked occasionally recording voice-overs for phonograph records for the Pathé Frères company, a pioneer in the cinema and audio recording industries. After 1895, Pathé became more involved in cinema. Gaumont first hired Zecca as an actor in 1898 but Zecca directed his first film for Pathé, an experimental sound production, Le Muet mélomane (1899) based on a musical Zecca and another artist, Charlus, were performing. At the request of entrepreneur Georges Dufayel, owner of the Grands Magasins Dufayel, they acted the piece before a ciné camera. His next film, Les Méfaits d'une tête de veau (1899) was for Gaumont.

In 1900, unable to personally do the work, Charles Pathé had Zecca set up the Pathé pavilion in the Paris World Fair (Exposition Universelle). After seeing his work, Pathé offered Zecca a position in his film company in Vincennes, first as an assistant to a director. Engaging Zecca "for a few weeks", he quickly became Pathé's right-hand man and was soon creating and directing his own films.

Zecca often appeared in his own films including À la conquête de l'air (1901).

Zecca explored many themes from the mundane to the fantastic. In À la conquête de l'air (1901), a strange flying machine, called Fend-l'air, was seen flying over the rooftops of Belleville. By using trick photography, the one-minute short was notable in being the first aviation film, predating the flight by the Wright Brothers by two years. (Note: Zecca had filmed an actor in the strange contraption suspended from the studio roof with the camera having half the frame blocked. The film was then rewound and the city landscape was shot in the previously blacked-out portion, creating the first split-screen effect.)

Zecca also pioneered one of the first crime dramas, Histoire d'un crime (1901), stylistically innovative in its use of superimposition. The story was of a man condemned to death, awaiting execution with his crimes appearing on his cell wall. The film is an early example of flashbacks as a film device. Other films included comedies, trick films or fairy tales, such as Les Sept châteaux du Diable, both 1901, and La Belle au bois dormant in 1902, as well as social dramas like Les Victimes de l'alcoolisme (1902), Au pays noir (1905) and reconstructions of actual events, the most famous being La Catastrophe de la Martinique (1902).

Zecca acted in many of his films. At the end of 1906, assisted by the Spaniard Segundo de Chomón's photography and special effects, Zecca continued to experiment. He co-directed La Vie et la passion de Jésus Christ (1903), which, at a running time of 44 minutes, was one of the first feature-length films about Jesus. He started filming in colour, with second Vie et Passion de N.S. Jésus Christ, shot in four parts with 38 scenes, 990 metres long, which was finished in 1907.

Between 1900 and 1907, Zecca oversaw the production of hundreds of Pathé films from many important Pathé directors including Nonguet Lucien, Gaston Velle, Albert Capellani, Louis J. Gasnier, André Heuzé and Henri Pouctal. Zecca also acted, directed, produced, and, on occasion, wrote films. After Pathé bought the rights to Star films, Zecca started editing films by Georges Méliès.

Appointed Managing Director of Pathé in 1905, in 1913 Zecca was sent to the United States to take charge of the American Pathé production house. He returned to France in 1919, where as a co-director with René Leprincee, he made Le Calvaire d'une reine, his last film. In the same year, Zecca was appointed to head the Pathé-Baby division, producing equipment and cameras for thin film, where he worked until his retirement in 1939.

In March 1947 at the age of 83, in his residence at Saint-Mandé, France, Ferdinand Zecca died.

== Filmography ==
as director

- 1899: Les Mésaventures d'un muet mélomane (Le Muet mélomane)
- 1899: Les Méfaits d'une tête de veau
- 1901: Une tempête dans une chambre à coucher
- 1901: Une idylle sous un tunnel
- 1901: Un duel abracadabrant
- 1901: Un drame au fond de la mer
- 1901: La Soupière merveilleuse
- 1901: Les Sept Châteaux du diable
- 1901: Rêve et Réalité
- 1901: Plongeur fantastique
- 1901: Par le trou de la serrure
- 1901: La Mégère récalcitrante
- 1901: Le Mauvais Riche
- 1901: La Loupe de grand-maman
- 1901: L'Illusionniste mondain
- 1901: Histoire d'un crime
- 1901: L'Enfant Prodigue
- 1901: Comment on met son couvert
- 1901: Comment Fabien devient architecte
- 1901: Scènes vues de mon balcon (Ce que je vois de mon sixième)
- 1901: À la conquête de l'air
- 1901: L'Agent plongeur
- 1901: Une discussion politique
- 1901: Quo Vadis?
- 1902: Les Victimes de l'alcoolisme
- 1902: Une séance de cinématographe
- 1902: La Fée des roches noires
- 1902: Le Conférencier distrait
- 1902: Chez le photographe
- 1902: La Catastrophe de la Martinique
- 1902: La Belle au bois dormant (coréalisation de Lucien Nonguet)
- 1902: Baignade impossible
- 1902: L'Assommoir
- 1902: L'Affaire Dreyfus
- 1902: La Poule merveilleuse
- 1902: Ali Baba et les quarante voleurs
- 1902: L'Assassinat du duc de Guise
- 1903: Samson et Dalila
- 1903: Repas infernal
- 1903: La Soubrette ingénieuse
- 1903: Le Chien et la Pipe
- 1903: Le Premier Cigare du collégien
- 1903: Le Démon du jeu ou la Vie d'un joueur (La Vie d'un joueur)
- 1903: Les Aventures de Don Quichotte (Don Quichotte) (coréalisation de Lucien Nonguet)
- 1903: Le Chat botté (coréalisation de Lucien Nonguet)
- 1904: The Wrong Door
- 1904: Le Portrait
- 1904: Les Petits Coupeurs de bois vert
- 1904: Le Pêcheur de perles
- 1904: Annie's Love Story
- 1904: La Grève
- 1905: La Passion de Notre-Seigneur Jésus Christ (La Vie et la Passion de Jésus Christ)
- 1905: Un drame à Venise
- 1905: Rêve à la lune (coréalisation de Gaston Velle)
- 1905: Le Remords
- 1905: La Course aux tonneaux
- 1905: Automobile et Cul-de-jatte
- 1905: Au Pays Noir
- 1905: Au bagne
- 1905: L'alcool engendre la tuberculose
- 1905: L'Incendiaire
- 1905: Dix femmes pour un mari (coréalisation de Georges Hatot et Lucien Nonguet)
- 1905: L'Honneur d'un père
- 1905: Vendetta
- 1905: Les Apaches de Paris
- 1905: Brigandage moderne
- 1907: Le Spectre rouge (coréalisation de Segundo de Chomón)
- 1907: Le Poil à gratter
- 1907: Métempsycose
- 1907: L'Homme Protée
- 1907: La Course des sergents de ville
- 1908: Samson (coréalisation d'Henri Andréani)
- 1908: Le Rêve d'agent
- 1908: L'Affaire Dreyfus
- 1909: Le Caprice du vainqueur
- 1910: La Tragique Aventure de Robert le Taciturne, duc d'Aquitaine
- 1910: Slippery Jim
- 1910: Cléopâtre (coréalisation d'Henri Andréani)
- 1910: 1812, (coréalisation de Camille de Morlhon)

All films below are co-directed by René Leprincee

- 1912: La Fièvre de l'or
- 1913: Le Roi de l'air
- 1913: La Leçon du gouffre
- 1913: La Comtesse noire
- 1913: Cœur de femme
- 1913: Plus fort que la haine (film, 1913)
- 1914: La Danse héroïque
- 1914: La Lutte pour la vie
- 1914: La Jolie Bretonne
- 1914: L'Étoile du génie
- 1915: Le Vieux Cabotin
- 1915: Le Noël d'un vagabond
- 1919: Les Larmes du pardon
- 1919: Le Calvaire d'une reine

As producer

- 1901: Scènes vues de mon balcon (Ce que je vois de mon sixième)
- 1901: À la conquête de l'air
- 1903: Le Démon du jeu ou La vie d'un joueur (La Vie d'un joueur)
- 1906: Pauvre Mère
- 1906: La Grève des bonnes
- 1907: Cendrillon, ou la Pantoufle merveilleuse (Cendrillon) d'Albert Capellani
- 1907: Les Débuts d'un patineur
- 1908: Don Juan
- 1912: Boireau, roi de la boxe
- 1913: Les Incohérences de Boireau
- 1913: Boireau empoisonneur
- 1913: Boireau spadassin

as actor

- 1899: Les Mésaventures d'une tête mélomane (Le Muet mélomane)
- 1901: Une idylle sous un tunnel
- 1901: Histoire d'un crime
- 1901: Comment on met son couvert
- 1901: À la conquête de l'air
- 1902: Une séance de cinématographe
- 1902: Chez le photographe
- 1902: La Poule merveilleuse
- 1905: L'Amant de la lune (Rêve à la lune): Le pochard
- 1905: Automobile et cul-de-jatte
- 1905: Créations renversantes
- 1912: Rigadin aux Balkans

as writer

- 1901: Histoire d'un crime
- 1902: Les Victimes de l'alcoolisme
- 1903: Le Démon du jeu ou La vie d'un joueur (La Vie d'un joueur)
- 1905: L'Amant de la lune (Rêve à la lune)
- 1906: Le Théâtre de Bob
- 1910: La Tragique aventure de Robert le Taciturne, duc d'Aquitaine
- 1915: Le Malheur qui passe

== See also ==
- Histoire d'un crime
