= Pathé =

French film production company

Pathé SAS
- Logo used since 1999
- Formerly: Société Nouvelle Pathé-Cinéma
- Type: Private
- Industry: Entertainment
- Founded: 28 September 1896; 130 years ago
- Founder: Charles Pathé; Émile Pathé; Théophile Pathé; Jacques Pathé
- Headquarters: 2 Rue Lamennais 75008, Paris, France
- Area served: France; Switzerland; Benelux; West Africa
- Key people: Jérôme Seydoux (chairman); Eduardo Malone (vice president)
- Revenue: ▲€903 million (2017)
- Owner: Jérôme Seydoux; Eduardo Malone; CMA CGM (20%)
- Number of employees: 4,210 (2017)
- Subsidiaries: Pathé Films; Pathé Séries; Pathé Cinémas; Fondation Pathé; Vendôme Production; Pricel; The Searchers (50%)
- Website: pathe.com

Pathé SAS (Note: French: [pate]) (stylized as PATHÉ! since 1999) is a French film production and distribution company which owns cinema chains (through its subsidiary Pathé Cinémas) and television networks across Europe. Pathé was founded by the Pathé Brothers in 1896, and is the second-oldest operating film company after Gaumont.

Pathé was originally a network of French businesses. In the early 1900s, it became the world's largest film equipment and production company, as well as a major producer of phonograph records. In 1908, Pathé invented the newsreel that was shown in cinemas before a feature film.

Since Gaumont studio sold its cinemas to Pathé in 2017, Pathé Cinéma has become the oldest cinema circuit in the world still active and is currently the biggest circuit in France and the Netherlands.

Pathé is also still one of the biggest production companies in France and Europe today, regularly producing films with budgets around $50 million. For example, in 2024, the historic group has released the successful The Count of Monte Cristo.

== History ==
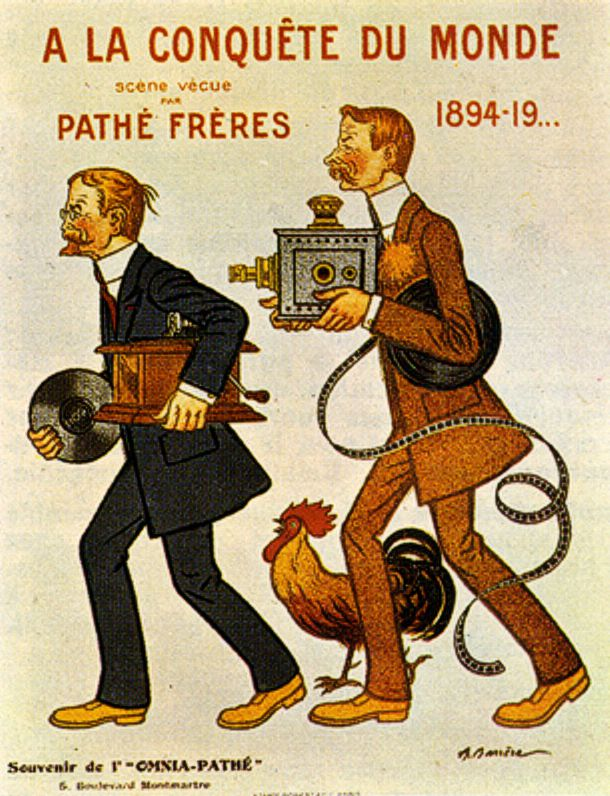
The Pathé Brothers by Adrien Barrère

The company was founded as Société Pathé Frères (French: [pate fʁɛʁ]; "Pathé Brothers Company") in Paris, France on 28 September 1896, by the four brothers Charles, Émile, Théophile and Jacques Pathé. During the first part of the 20th century, Pathé became the largest film equipment and production company in the world, as well as a major producer of phonograph records.

At its peak, before World War I, Charles Pathé's company had almost 50% of the world film market, including in the United States.

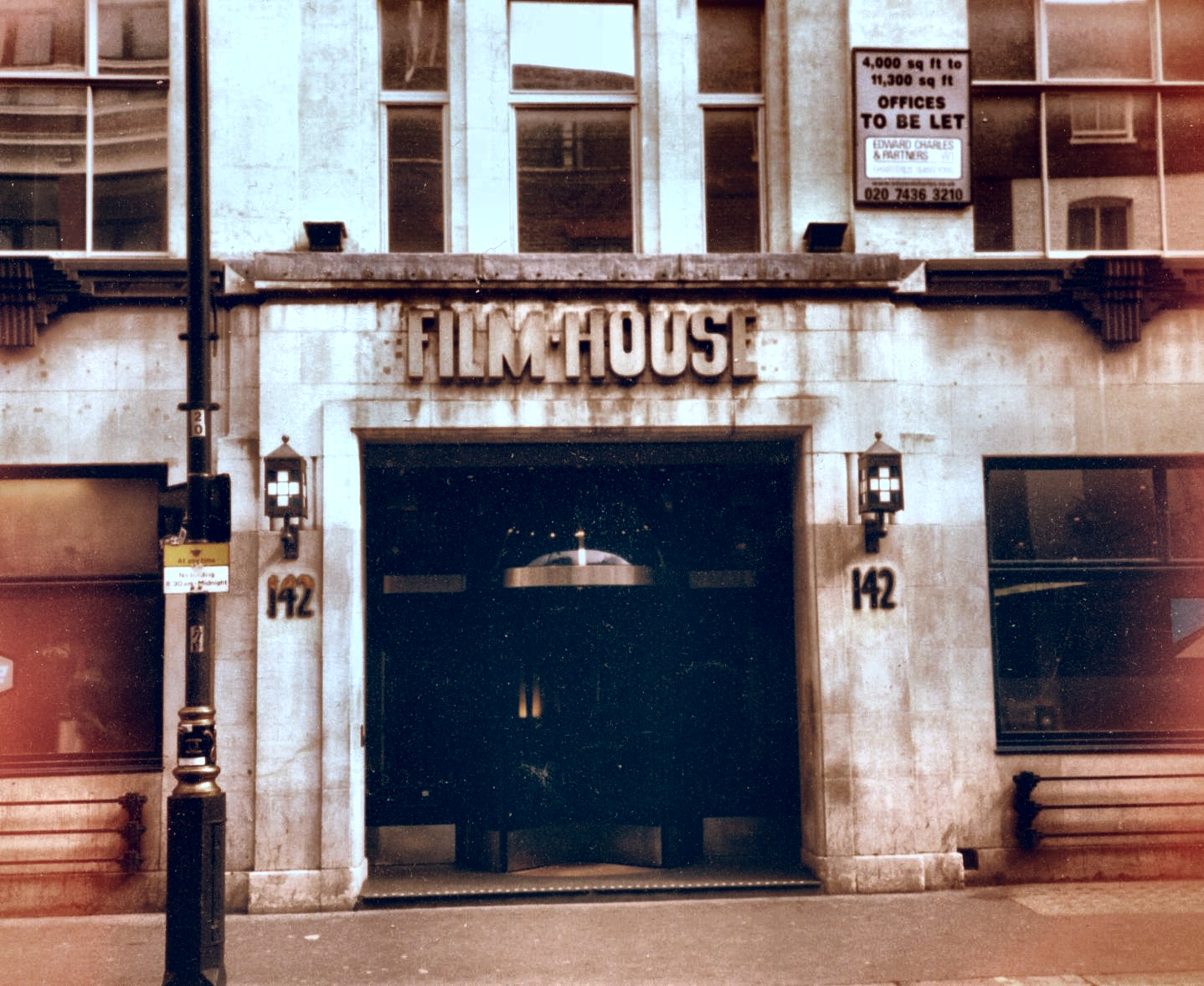
Headquarters of Associated British-Pathé at 142 Wardour Street in London

=== Pathé Records ===
The driving force behind the film operation and phonograph business was Charles Pathé, who had helped open a phonograph shop in 1894 and established a phonograph factory at Chatou on the western outskirts of Paris. The Pathé brothers began selling Edison and Columbia phonographs and accompanying cylinder records and later, the brothers designed and sold their own phonographs that incorporated elements of other brands. Soon after, they also started marketing pre-recorded cylinder records. By 1896 the Pathé brothers had offices and recording studios not only in Paris, but also in London, Milan, and St. Petersburg. Pathé manufactured cylinder records until approximately 1914. In 1905, the Pathé brothers entered the growing field of disc records.

In France, Pathé became the largest and most successful distributor of cylinder records and phonographs. These, however, failed to make headway in foreign markets such as the United Kingdom and the United States where other brands were already in widespread use.

In December 1928, the French and British Pathé phonograph assets were sold to the British Columbia Graphophone Company. In July 1929, the assets of the American Pathé record company were merged into the newly formed American Record Corporation.

The Pathé and Pathé-Marconi labels and catalogue still survive, first as imprints of EMI and now currently EMI's successor Parlophone Records. In 1967 EMI Italiana took control of the entire catalog. In turn, the Universal Music Group acquired EMI Italiana in 2013.

=== Pathé' beginnings and world domination ===
As the phonograph business became successful, Pathé saw the opportunities offered by new means of entertainment and in particular by the fledgling motion picture industry. Having decided to expand the record business to include film equipment, the company expanded dramatically. To finance its growth, the company took the name Compagnie Générale des Établissements Pathé Frères Phonographes & Cinématographes (sometimes abbreviated as CGPC) in 1897, and its shares were listed on the Paris Stock Exchange. In 1896, Mitchell Mark of Buffalo, New York, became the first American to import Pathé films to the United States, where they were shown in the Vitascope Theater.

film Histoire d'un crime, first realistic drama in the history of cinema

In 1901, Ferdinand Zecca and Charles Pathé decided to capitalize on the public's morbid penchant for gory crime stories by creating Histoire d'un crime, which is considered the first realistic drama in the history of cinema. Histoire d'un crime also invented the first flashback in the cinema. The final scene, which shows a beheading, caused a scandal. The film was a notable success, launching a wave of similar films.

In 1904, Pathé produced the first Western films in cinema, and in 1910, it opened the first studio entirely dedicated to this genre, which was located in Los Angeles, shortly before the birth of the film industry in the Hollywood district of Los Angeles.

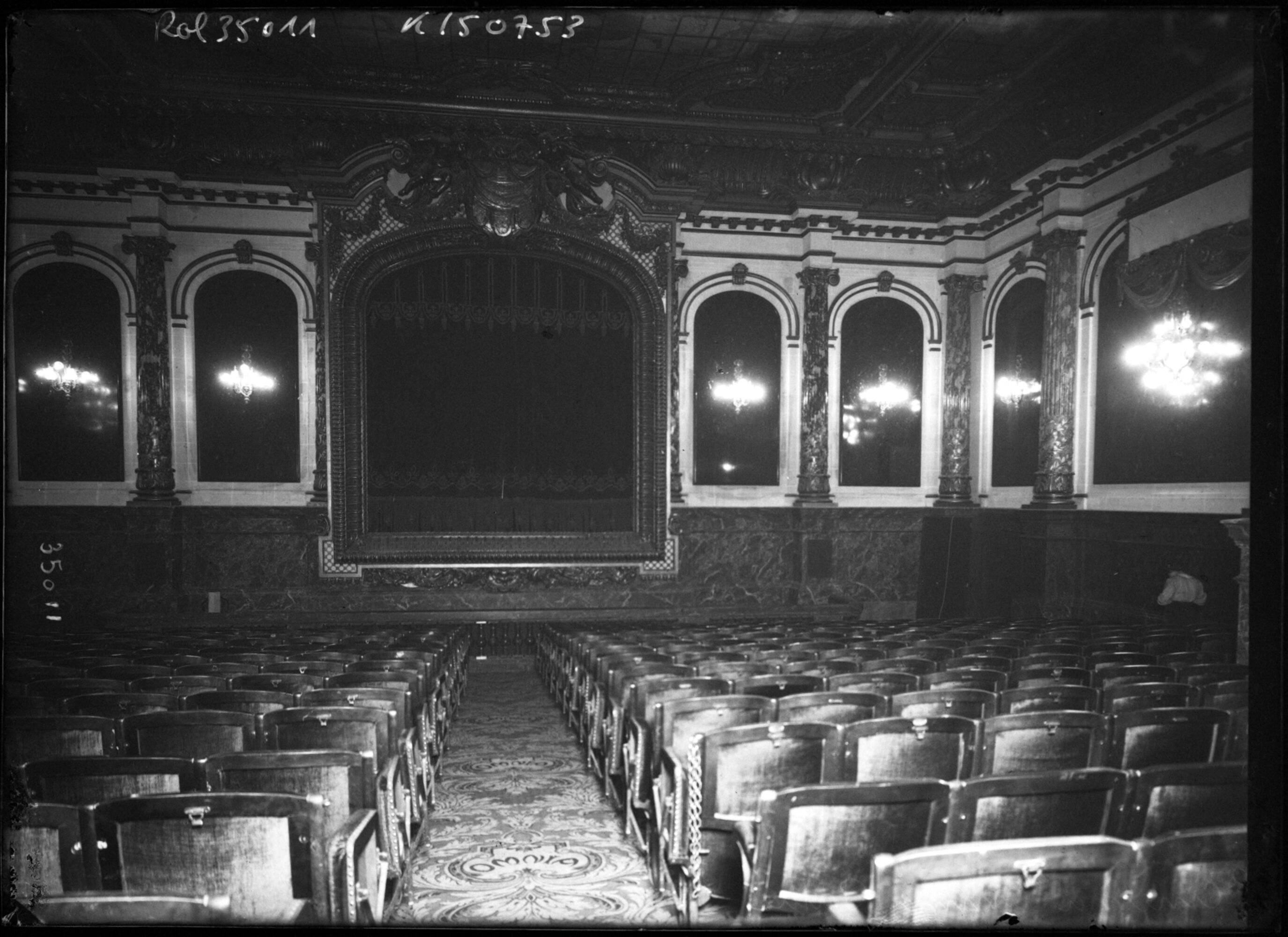
Interior of the Omnia-Pathé in Paris, the oldest cinema of the Pathé group (no longer existing).

In 1906, Charles Pathé opened one of the first permanent movie theaters with the Omnia-Pathé (as cinema had until then been a Fairground Attraction), which also became the oldest cinema of the Pathé group. By the following year, more than 300 Pathé theaters already existed, and the network was rapidly expanding in the rest of the world. As with production and distribution, the French company established itself as the world leader in movie theaters for several years. Today, Pathé Cinemas remains the leading theater operator in France and the Netherlands, and the oldest still in operation worldwide.

In 1907, Pathé acquired the Lumière brothers' patents and then set about to design an improved studio camera and to make their own film stock. Their technologically advanced equipment, new processing facilities built at Vincennes, and aggressive merchandising combined with efficient distribution systems allowed them to capture a huge share of the international market. They first expanded to London in 1902 where they set up production facilities and a chain of cinemas.

By 1909, Pathé had built more than 200 cinemas in France and Belgium and by the following year they had facilities in Madrid, Moscow, Rome and New York City plus Australia and Japan. Slightly later, they opened a film exchange in Buffalo, New York. Through its American subsidiary, it was part of the MPPC cartel of production in the United States. It participated in the Paris Film Congress in February 1909 as part of a plan to create a similar European organisation. The company withdrew from the project in a second meeting in April which fatally undermined the proposal. In 1906, Pathé Frères had pioneered the luxury cinema with the opening of the Omnia Cinéma-Pathé in Paris.

Prior to the outbreak of World War I, Pathé dominated Europe's market in motion picture cameras and projectors. It has been estimated that at one time, 60 percent of all films were shot with Pathé equipment. In 1908, Pathé distributed Excursion to the Moon by Segundo de Chomón, an imitation of Georges Méliès's A Trip to the Moon. Pathé and Méliès worked together in 1911. Méliès made a film Baron Munchausen's Dream, his first film to be distributed by Pathé. Pathé's relationship with Méliès soured, and after he went bankrupt in 1913, his last film was never released by Pathé.

After World War I, Charles Pathé started divesting himself from various film interests, believing that the French film industry would never recover after 1918. The company's subsequent decline relegated Pathé primarily as a distributor of short subjects and it became a minor player in the mainstream film industry.

In 1929, Charles Pathé retired from cinema and entrusted the management of the company to Bernard Natan. Bernard Natan partially revived Pathé, which once again became the leading player in French cinema. He relaunched film production, notably with Les Misérables (1934), and expanded the Pathé Cinema network in France, including the construction of the Pathé Bellecour in Lyon, which remains in operation under the Pathé group today.

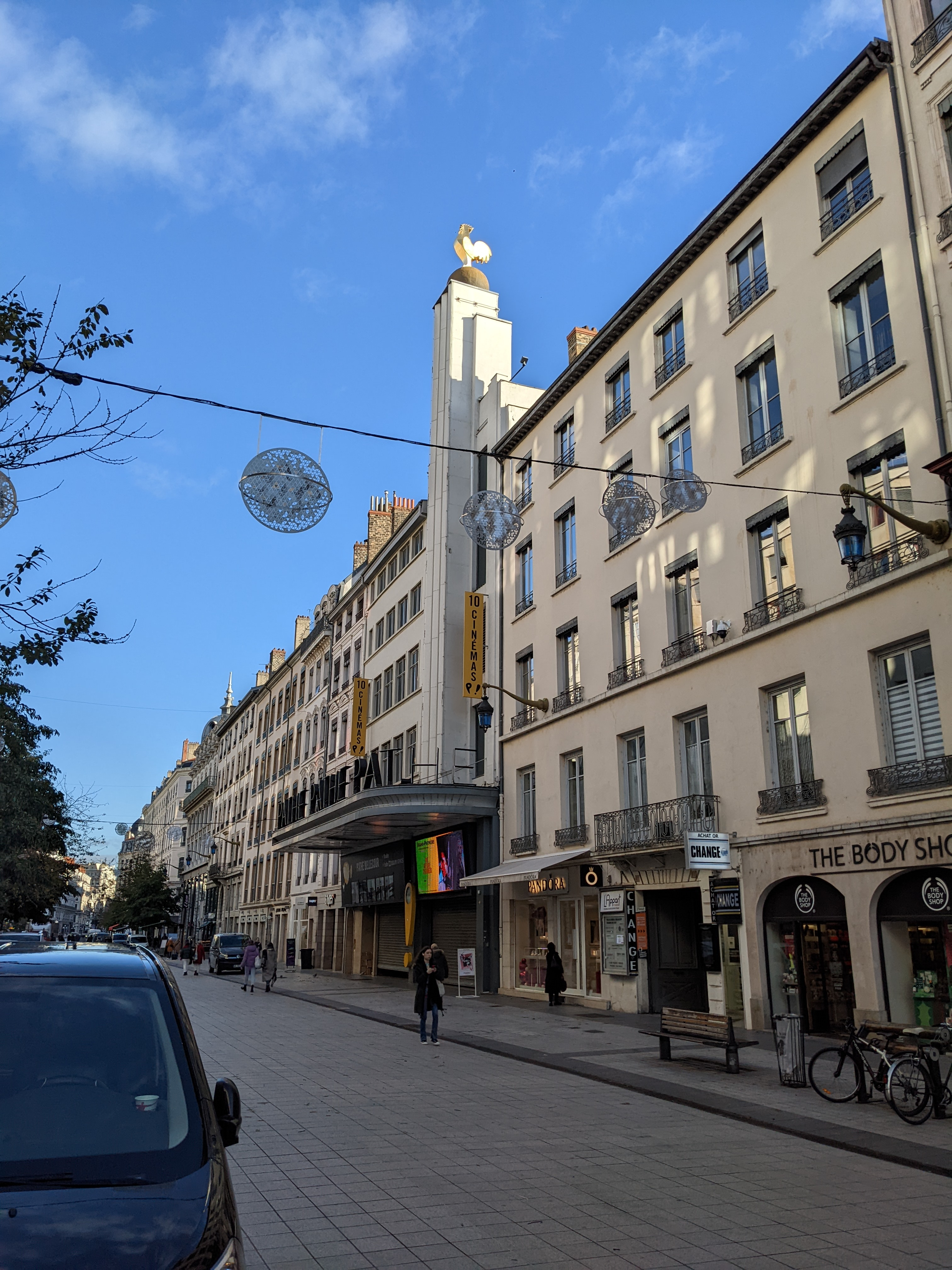
Exterior of the Pathé Bellecour in Lyon, built by the Pathé group in 1933 and which is still active

Deported to Auschwitz during the Second World War as he was Jewish, Bernard Natan was murdered by the Nazi regime in 1942. Despite severe weakening, Pathé survived and gradually resumed its activities towards the end of the Second World War, most notably with the release of Children of Paradise (1945).

=== Innovations ===
Worldwide, the company emphasised research, investing in such experiments the synchronisation of film and gramophone recordings. In 1908, Pathé invented the newsreel that was shown in theatres prior to the feature film. The news clips featured the Pathé logo of a crowing rooster at the beginning of each reel. In 1912, it introduced 28 mm non-flammable film and equipment under the brand name Pathescope. Pathé News produced cinema newsreels from 1910, up until the 1970s when production ceased as a result of mass television ownership.

In 1907, the Pathé group decided to abandon the outright sale of film prints and instead establish a novel rental system for cinema operators. This measure, motivated by the market's profitability crisis and the saturation caused by the resale of worn-out prints, marked a decisive break in the film industry: for the first time, a producer-distributor retained ownership of the prints and rented them to cinemas, ensuring the quality of screenings and regular revenue. This innovation, initiated by Charles Pathé, laid the foundations for the modern film distribution model, still based today on the rental of films.

In the United States, beginning in 1914, the company built film production studios in Fort Lee and Jersey City, New Jersey, where their building still stands. The Heights, Jersey City produced the extremely successful serialised episodes called The Perils of Pauline. By 1918 Pathé had grown to the point where it was necessary to separate operations into two distinct divisions. With Emile Pathé as chief executive, Pathé Records dealt exclusively with phonographs and recordings. Brother Charles managed Pathé-Cinéma, which was responsible for film production, distribution, and exhibition.

In 1922 they introduced the Pathé Baby home film system using a new 9.5 mm film stock, which became popular during the next few decades. In 1921, Pathé sold off its United States motion picture production arm. It was renamed "Pathé Exchange" and later merged into RKO Pictures, disappearing as an independent brand in 1931. Pathé sold its British film studios to Eastman Kodak in 1927, while maintaining the theatre and distribution arm.

Pathé-Baby 9.5 mm film version of La Cité foudroyée (1924)

=== Natan to Parretti ===
Pathé was already in substantial financial trouble when Bernard Natan took control of the company in 1929. Studio founder Charles Pathé had been selling assets for several years to boost investor value and keep the studio's cash flow healthy. The company's founder had even sold Pathé's name and "rooster" trademark to other companies in return for a mere two percent of revenue. Natan had the bad luck to take charge of the studio just as the Great Depression convulsed the French economy.

Natan attempted to steady Pathé's finances and implement modern film industry practices at the studio. He acquired another film studio, Société des Cinéromans, from Arthur Bernède and Gaston Leroux, which let Pathé expand into projector and electronics manufacturing. He also bought the Fornier chain of motion picture theatres and rapidly expanded the chain's nationwide presence. The French press, however, attacked Natan mercilessly for his stewardship of Pathé. Many of these attacks were antisemitic.

Pathé-Natan did well under Natan's guidance. Between 1930 and 1935, despite the world economic crisis, the company made 100 million francs in profits, and produced and released more than 60 feature films (just as many films as major American studios produced at the time). He resumed production of the newsreel Pathé News, which had not been produced since 1927.

Natan also invested heavily into research and development to expand Pathé's film business. In 1929, he pushed Pathé into sound film. In September, the studio produced its first sound feature film, and its first sound newsreel a month later. Natan also launched two new cinema-related magazines, Pathé-Revue and Actualités Féminines, to help market Pathé's films and build consumer demand for cinema. Under Natan, Pathé also funded the research of Henri Chrétien, who developed the anamorphic lens (leading to the creation of CinemaScope and other widescreen film formats common today).

Natan expanded Pathé's business interests into communications industries other than film. In November 1929, Natan established France's first television company, Télévision-Baird-Natan. A year later, he purchased a radio station in Paris and formed a holding company (Radio-Natan-Vitus) to run what would become a burgeoning radio empire.

To finance the company's continued expansion, Pathé's board of directors (which still included Charles Pathé) had voted in 1930 to issue shares worth 105 million francs. Then the Great Depression hit France in 1931, and only 50 percent of the shares were purchased. One of the investor banks collapsed due to financial difficulties unrelated to Pathé's problems, and Pathé was forced to follow through with the purchase of several cinema chains it no longer could afford to buy. Although the company continued to make a profit, it lost more money thanks to these acquisitions than it could bring in. In 1935, a commercial court began examining Pathé's accounts, and by 1936 it was declared bankrupt and Natan was dismissed. The studios were not doing badly and continued to make films, but his companies went into receivership and were claimed by the state.

French authorities pursued charges of fraud against Natan, including financing the purchase of the company without any collateral, of bilking investors by establishing fictitious shell corporations, and financial mismanagement. He was also accused of hiding his Romanian and Jewish heritage by changing his name. In 1938, Natan was arrested and imprisoned, never to regain his freedom. In 1939 he was indicted and sentenced to four years in jail. As a result, he was in prison when France fell to the Nazis, a time when other Jewish filmmakers fled or went into hiding. On his release from prison in 1942, he was delivered to the Nazis, and by September 1942 had been deported to Auschwitz, where he was murdered.

In 1943, the company was forced to undergo a restructuring, and was acquired by Adrien Ramauge, changing its name to Société Nouvelle Pathé Cinema. Over the years, the business underwent a number of changes including diversification into producing programmes for the burgeoning television industry. During the 1970s, operating theatres overtook film production as Pathé's primary source of revenue.

In the late 1980s, Italian financier Giancarlo Parretti tried to make a bid for Pathé, even taking over Cannon and renaming it Pathé Communications in anticipation of owning the storied studio. Parretti's shady past, however, raised enough eyebrows in the French government that the deal fell through. It turned out to be a fortunate decision, as Parretti later took over Metro-Goldwyn-Mayer, and merged it with his Pathé Communications Group to create MGM-Pathé Communications in 1990, only to lose it in bankruptcy in late 1991.

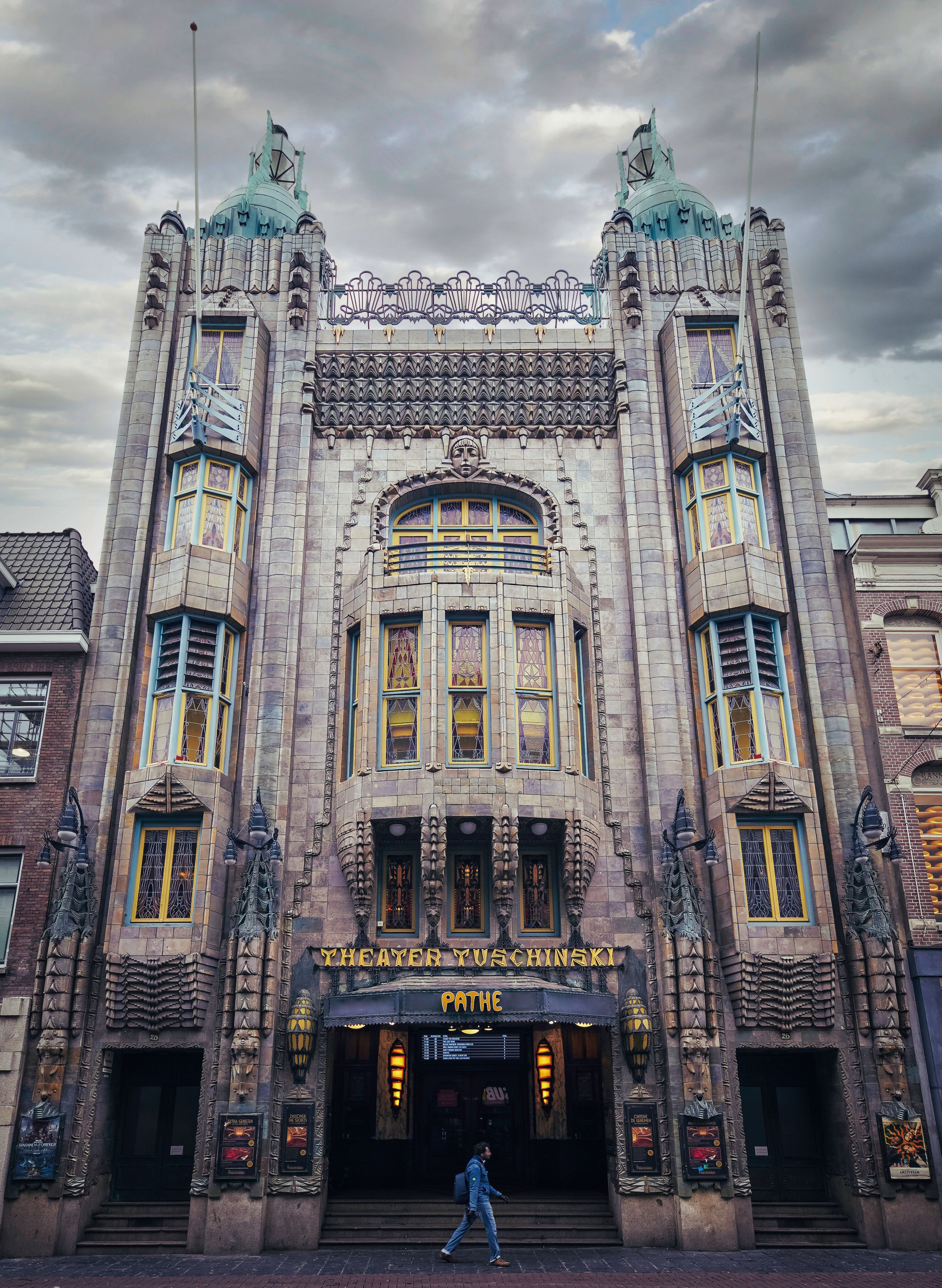
Exterior of the Pathé Tuchinski, in Amsterdam

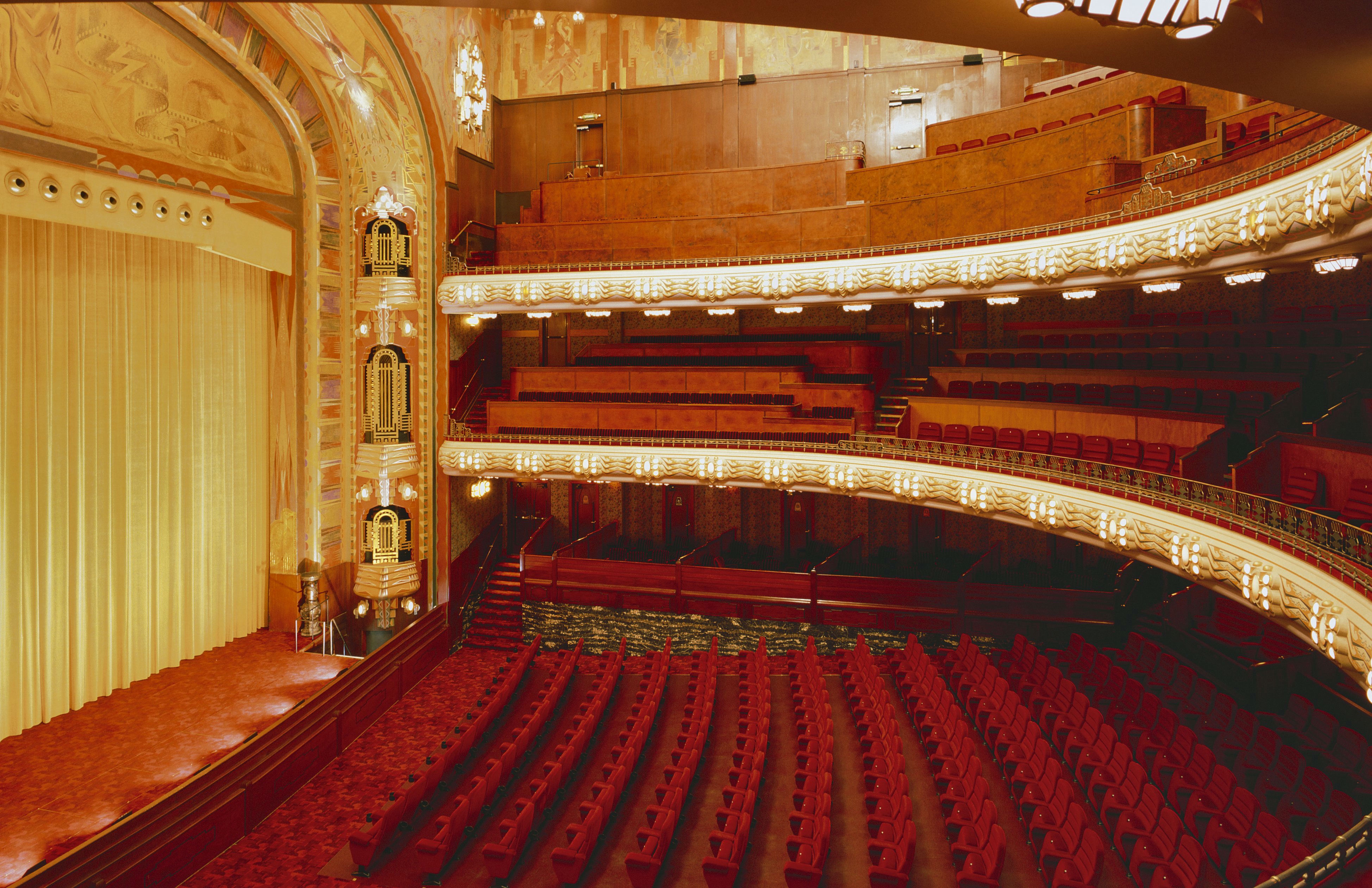
Interior of the Pathé Tuchinski, in Amsterdam

=== Jérôme Seydoux ===
In 1990 Chargeurs, a French conglomerate led by Jérôme Seydoux, took control of the company. As a result of the deregulation of the French telecommunications market, in June 1999 Pathé merged with Vivendi, with the exchange ratio for the merger fixed at three Vivendi shares for every two Pathé shares. The Wall Street Journal estimated the value of the deal at US$2.59 billion. Following the completion of the merger, Vivendi retained Pathé's interests in British Sky Broadcasting and CanalSatellite, a French broadcasting corporation, but then sold all remaining assets to Jérôme Seydoux's family-owned corporation, Fornier SA, which changed its name to Pathé.

In 2004, Pathé co-produced and distributed the cult film The Chorus by Christophe Barratier, which drew nearly 9 million admissions at the French box office. The film is also a remake of A Cage of Nightingales from the Gaumont studio.

In 2008, Pathé released the film Bienvenue Chez Les Ch'tis, with over 20 million admissions in France, it is still today the biggest box office success in France, ahead of all American productions and other French movie, except Titanic (1997).

As of 2024, Pathé is the largest cinema chain in France, with 78 theaters and a 20% market share, as well as the country's leading French producer and distributor in terms of box office admissions, notably boosted by the big success of its French blockbuster The Count of Monte Cristo, the movie having had 9 million admissions in France theaters and generated 100 million dollars worldwide.

In 2026, in addition to the release of its two-part blockbuster on the Second World War De Gaulle, the group is launching Emotion pictures, a subsidiary (created with other partners) which will shoot big productions in English but with people mainly from French cinema. The aim of this new subsidiary is to once again offer an alternative to American blockbusters for films shot in English. In parallel, Pathé also became involved in the Yapluka investment fund launched by Dimitri Rassam (producer with Pathé of The Count of Monte Cristo), which is involved in making European blockbusters. In July 2026, Pathé acquired a 50% stake in the Benelux film distributor The Searchers; the company will become the exclusive distributor for Pathé films in the Benelux, starting with the two-part film De Gaulle, while continuing to acquire independent titles.

The group's headquarters are located in Paris, currently in the Pathé Palace, which is also one of the group's cinemas.

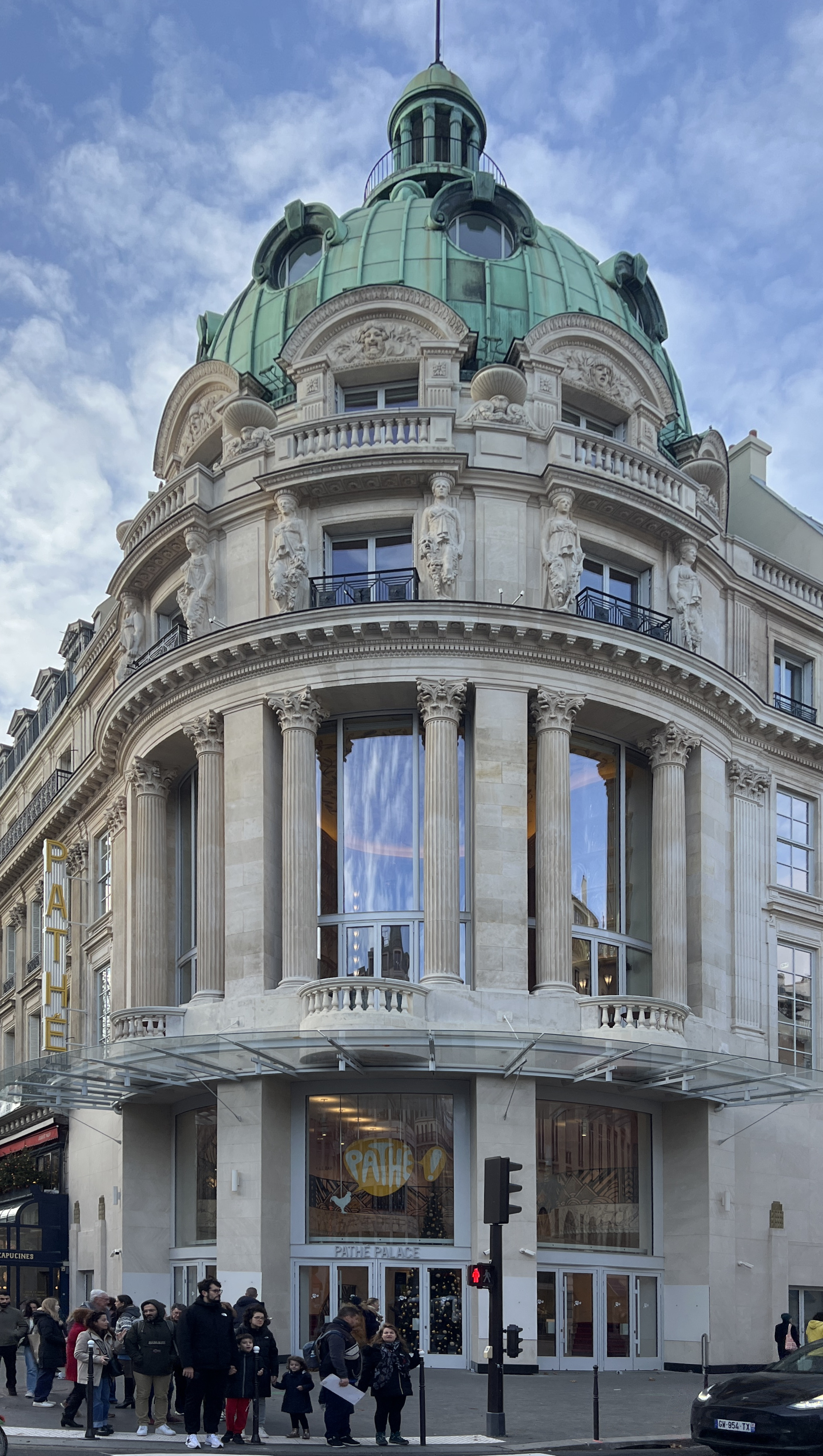
Pathé Palace cinema in Paris, where the group's headquarters are currently located.

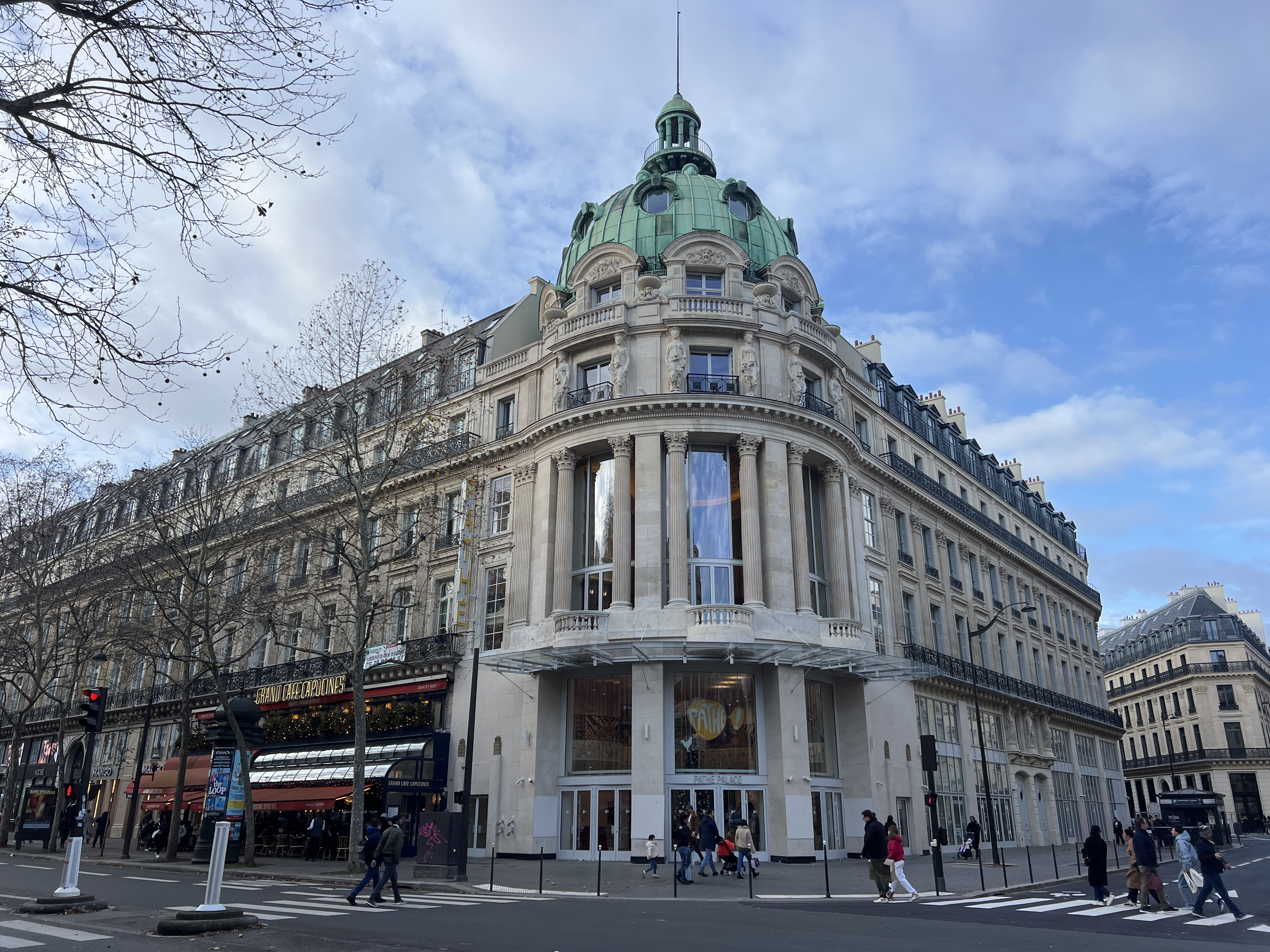
More distant view of the Pathé Palace

== Assets ==
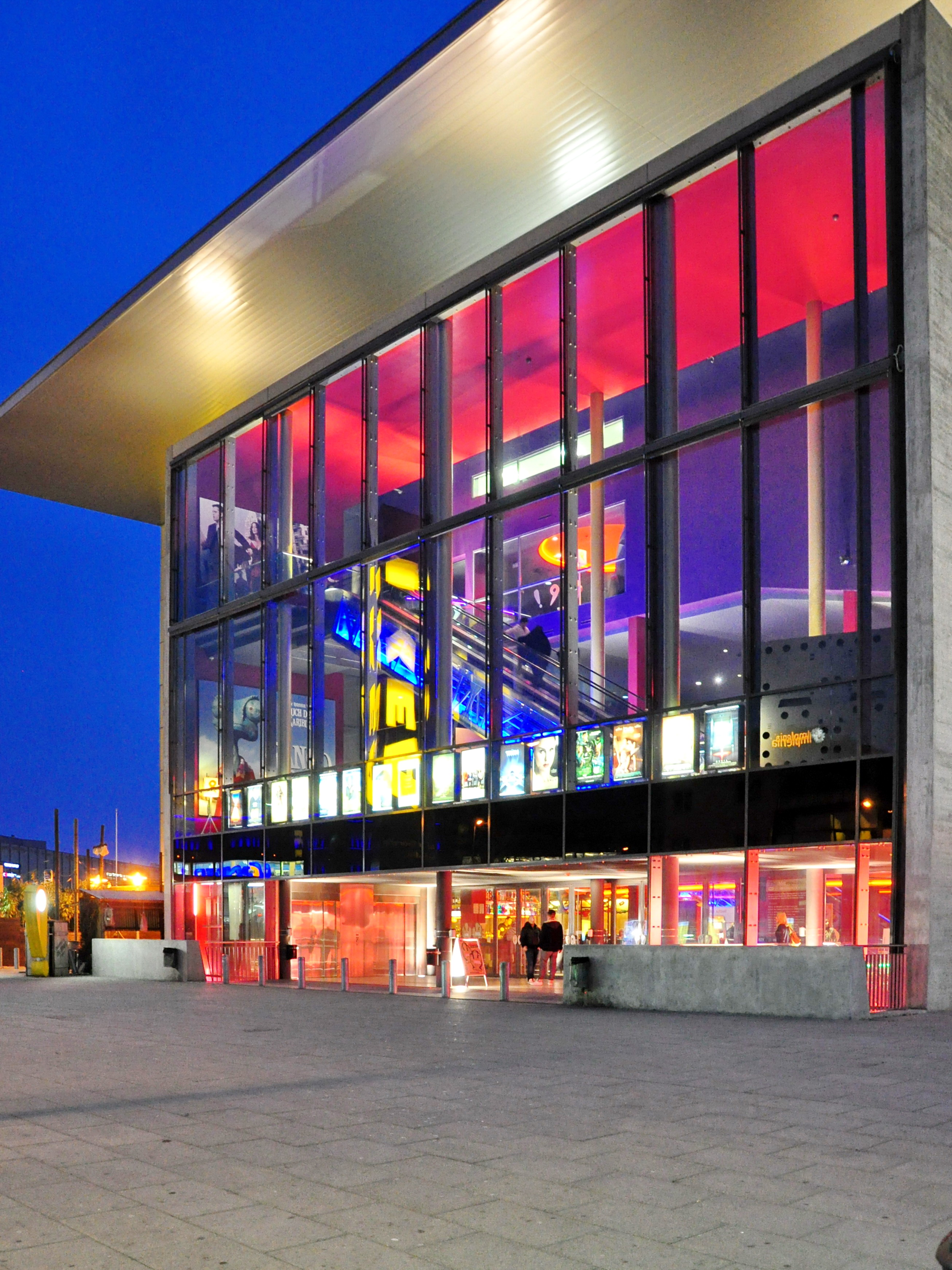
Pathé multiplex in Dietlikon, Switzerland

A list of current and former assets of Pathé.

=== Current assets ===
- Pathé Cinémas (cinema chain)
- Pathé Films (film production in France & distribution in France and Switzerland, with a catalogue of over 800 films)
- Pathé Touch Afrique (film distribution company operating in the Maghreb and French-speaking sub-Saharan Africa founded in 2020 as Pathé BC Afrique)
- Pathé Live (distributor of event cinema)
- The Jérôme Seydoux-Pathé Foundation : is the only private foundation recognized as being of public utility by France. The Pathé Foundation, located in Paris (not far from the Pathé group's headquarters), is in addition to being a research center on the beginnings of cinema, is responsible for preserving and restoring the group's heritage, and to regularly offering various silent film screenings and also various exhibitions on the beginnings of cinema, whether on Pathé or other groups.
- Since July 2026, Pathé has also held a 50% stake in the Benelux film distribution company The Searchers.

=== Former assets ===
- The OL Groupe (19.98% capital / 24,33 voting rights) (football club)
- Comédie+ bought in 2003, sold in 2004 to the Canal+ Group (via MultiThématiques).
- Cuisine.tv created in 2001 with RF2K, sold in 2011 to the Canal+ Group (via MultiThématiques).
- Histoire created in 1997, owned 30%, sold in 2004 to the TF1 Group.
- Pathé Sport bought in 1998, sold in 2002 to Canal+ Group.
- TMC bought 80% in 2002, sold in 2004 to TF1 Group and AB Groupe.
- Voyage bought in 1997, sold in 2004 to Fox International Channels.
- Vis Pathé Cinemas sold in 2010 to UCI Italia.
- Fox Pathé Europa (joint venture with Walt Disney Studios Home Entertainment and EuropaCorp), closed in 2020.
- Pathé News
- GP Archives (owned 42.5%, sold its shares in 2019 to Gaumont)

== Distribution ==
=== France ===
In its home country France, Pathé self-distributes its films through Pathé Films, formerly called AMLF (Agence méditerranéenne de location de films) from 1972 to 1998.

=== United Kingdom ===
In August 1992, Pathé's then-parent company Chargeurs purchased Guild Entertainment from Wembley PLC, becoming Pathé's de facto UK distributor. Initially, PolyGram Video distributed Guild's VHS releases until March 1995, when Chargeurs formed a UK rental joint-venture with 20th Century Fox Home Entertainment, who became Guild/Pathé's home video distributor, the rental joint-venture would be named Fox Guild Home Entertainment.

After the Chargeurs demerger in 1996, Pathé began retiring the Guild brand, initially rebranding the theatrical arm as Guild Pathé Cinema and eventually in June 1997, as Pathé Distribution after securing a deal to produce films in the country. The home video division followed suit toward the end of the year, rebranding under the Pathé name, the video rental division Fox Guild Home Entertainment would be renamed Fox Pathé Home Entertainment the following year. Despite this, Guild Home Video remained as an in-name-only dormant business of Pathé until folding on 17 December 2019.

On 12 March 2009, Pathé announced that they would close their UK/Ireland theatrical distribution unit and form a new partnership with Warner Bros. Pictures to handle the theatrical distribution of their titles in the UK, following a handful of films that flopped at the box office. The move was made so Pathé could focus more on the development and production of its own titles instead of acquisitions. The partnership would allow the two companies working together to identify co-production opportunities. Pathé would remain as an international sales agent for films, while 20th Century Fox Home Entertainment would remain as the distributor for home video. Select film acquisitions that were planned to be distributed by Pathé, such as Chatroom and Dead Man Running, were sold to Revolver Entertainment.

On 1 February 2011, it was announced that 20th Century Fox would take over as Pathé's theatrical distributor. Pathé UK's co-CEO Francois Ivernel deemed it easier for one company to handle the licensing process for both theatrical and home video.

With the purchase of 20th Century Fox by the Walt Disney Company on 20 March 2019, Walt Disney Studios Motion Pictures took over distribution of Pathé's material, but would only release two films (those being Misbehaviour and The Human Voice), Walt Disney Studios Home Entertainment would release the two films on home video. The longstanding deal with Fox/Disney deal expired on 30 June 2021, and Pathé decided not to renew. Pathé UK managing director Cameron McCracken was pleased with Disney's treatment of the company's films, deeming them to have given the films the same treatment that Fox did.

On 7 June 2021, a few weeks before the expiration of the Fox deal, Pathé UK announced they would revert their distribution to Warner Bros. Pictures, with the first films being released under the new deal being Parallel Mothers and The Duke. Unlike the 2009 deal, this new deal would also include home video and digital rights as well, which Fox/Disney previously handled.

On 15 November 2023, Pathé UK announced that it would exit the UK theatrical market to focus a move into the premium television market. The exit was due to structural changes in the film industry following the impact of the Coronavirus pandemic, issues with the structure of independent distribution in the country (which led to their rival, Entertainment One UK closing their UK distribution arm in the middle of the year), some of their films flopping at the box office, and the retirement of Cameron McCracken. Some time later, StudioCanal UK took over distribution of their material on home video through their Elevation Sales joint-venture with Lionsgate UK.

In October 2024, Pathé UK acquired most of the Celador Films catalogue from owner Paul Smith, putting several Pathé-distributed films like Slumdog Millionaire under full ownership. The Celador Films division itself was also sold and renamed to Pathé CFL Limited, functioning as a copyright holder for the five film catalogue.

In May 2025, Pathé UK announced a possible return to the UK theatrical market.

In November 2025, Ben Browning was appointed CEO of Pathé UK and president of global film at Pathé, with a mandate to expand the company’s English-language film production.

== See also ==
- List of Pathé films
- Category:Pathé films
- Allied Filmmakers, a now-defunct UK-based subsidiary of Pathé
- Pathé News and British Pathé
- List of film serials by studio lists the Pathé film serials
- Fumagalli, Pion & C., Italian Pathé importer
