= Depictions of Jesus in films =

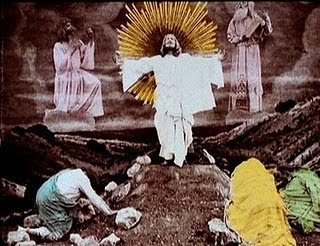
Scene from Vie et Passion du Christ (1903) by Ferdinand Zecca and Lucien Nonguet, notable for its early use of stencil coloring.

The depiction of Jesus in film has been a recurring subject since the birth of cinema in the late 19th century. Movies about Jesus have varied widely in tone, style, and intent, ranging from early silent Passion plays and golden-age Hollywood historical epics to modern artistic, musical, and controversial interpretations. Beyond religious dramatization, film scholars note that adaptations of the Gospel played a crucial role in the development of early cinematic syntax, editing techniques, and the economic legitimization of the film industry. The subject has also generated a substantial body of academic literature exploring the intersection between theology, visual arts, and film narrative.

== Silent era ==
The earliest filmed depictions of Jesus, produced between 1897 and the 1910s, consisted largely of short Passion plays and tableaux inspired by traditional Christian iconography and stage performances. During this initial period, sacred subject matter fulfilled a dual role: it provided moral and social legitimacy for the emerging cinematograph—attracting the bourgeoisie and the clergy to theaters—while the audience's familiarity with the Gospel narrative acted as a catalyst for the development of narrative editing, allowing filmmakers to sequence independent shots without the need for complex extradiegetic explanations.

Pioneering works from this era include Albert Kirchner's Passion du Christ (1897), Georges Hatot and Louis Lumière's La Vie et la Passion de Jésus-Christ (1898), Henry C. Vincent's The Passion Play of Oberammergau (1898, based on the Oberammergau Passion Play), Georges Méliès' Christ Walking on the Water (1899, pioneering trick photography for miraculous events), Ferdinand Zecca and Lucien Nonguet's Vie et Passion du Christ (1903–1907, noted for its early use of stencil coloring), Alice Guy-Blaché's The Birth, the Life and the Death of Christ (1906), André Calmettes and Armand Bour's Le Baiser de Judas (1908), Louis Feuillade's Le Christ en croix (1910), Sidney Olcott's From the Manger to the Cross (1912, filmed on location in Egypt and Palestine), and Giulio Antamoro's Christus (1916).

As silent cinema matured, Jesus increasingly appeared within ambitious historical epics and allegorical narratives that combined biblical text with the emerging language of feature-length filmmaking. Thomas H. Ince's Civilization (1916) presented Christ as a pacifist ideal during the First World War; D. W. Griffith integrated the Passion as an ethical climax within the parallel narrative structure of Intolerance (1916); Carl Theodor Dreyer's Leaves from Satan's Book (1920) portrayed Satan's recurring attempts to corrupt humanity, including the betrayal of Jesus, with an austere visual style; Robert Wiene's I.N.R.I. (1923) framed the Passion within an Expressionist story of persecution; and Cecil B. DeMille's The King of Kings (1927) established the monumental epic standard for the silent era.

== Sound era and Hollywood epics ==
The arrival of sound cinema allowed for more complex psychological and dramatic characterizations. Julien Duvivier's Golgotha (1935) was one of the earliest major sound feature films devoted directly to the trial and crucifixion. William Wyler's Ben-Hur (1959) portrayed Jesus indirectly, largely withholding his face to be reflected through the reactions of Judah Ben-Hur.

During the 1960s, Nicholas Ray's King of Kings (1961) explored the political context of Roman-occupied Judea, while George Stevens' The Greatest Story Ever Told (1965) presented a solemn, epic adaptation in classic Hollywood style. By contrast, Pier Paolo Pasolini's The Gospel According to St. Matthew (1964), filmed in black and white with non-professional actors in a neorealist aesthetic, portrayed a revolutionary and poetic Christ faithful to the Gospel text.

== Modern and contemporary cinema ==
From the 1970s onward, filmmakers explored increasingly diverse theological and aesthetic interpretations. Norman Jewison's Jesus Christ Superstar (1973) adapted the rock opera with anachronistic elements, while Roberto Rossellini's The Messiah (1975) emphasized the historical, everyday human dimensions of Jesus' ministry. Franco Zeffirelli's television production Jesus of Nazareth (1977) presented an extensive dramatization that heavily shaped the modern popular image of Christ.

In 1988, Martin Scorsese's The Last Temptation of Christ generated controversy through its depiction of Jesus' internal struggles and earthly doubts, whereas Denys Arcand's Jesus of Montreal (1989) transposed the Passion into a contemporary theatrical allegory in Quebec. Derek W. Hayes and Stanislav Sokolov's animated film The Miracle Maker (1999) combined stop-motion animation with traditional drawing; Mel Gibson's The Passion of the Christ (2004) focused on hyperrealistic physical violence during Jesus' final hours; and Christopher Spencer's Son of God (2014) returned to a conventional biblical dramatization.

== Academic studies ==
The depiction of Jesus in film has been the subject of critical and historiographical studies analyzing the intersection between theology and cinema:

- Le Visage du Christ à l'écran (1985) by Henri Agel: A pioneering study analyzing the spiritual dimension and aesthetics of the sacred face in European cinema.
- Jésus au cinéma (1997) by Pierre Prigent: A theological and historiographical examination of Gospel adaptations and the evolution of Christ on screen.
- Imaging the Divine: Jesus and Christ-Figures in Film (1997) by Lloyd Baugh: An analysis distinguishing between direct biblical biopics and allegorical Christ-figures in modern film.
- Jesus at the Movies: A Guide to the First Hundred Years (1997) by W. Barnes Tatum: A critical guide examining the historical and ideological context of major film adaptations over the first century of cinema.
- Jesus of Hollywood (2007) by Adele Reinhartz: An investigation into the narrative tropes and iconography used by the Hollywood film industry to shape the Gospel figure.
- Screen Jesus: Portrayals of Christ in Television and Film (2012) by Peter Malone: An analytical survey of Christological portrayals across both cinema and contemporary television.
- El rostro de Cristo en el cine: una lectura cinematográfica del Evangelio (2019) by Gustavo Bernstein: A semiotic and iconographic essay examining the tension between the biblical text and the filmic grammars that shaped the image of Christ.

== Filmography ==
=== 19th century ===
Year	Title	Director	Jesus portrayal	Country
1898	La Vie et la Passion de Jésus-Christ	Georges Hatot	Bretteau	France
1898	The Passion Play of Oberammergau	William C. Paley	Frank Russell	United States
1899	Christ Walking on the Water	Georges Méliès	Georges Méliès	France

=== 20th century ===
Year	Title	Director	Jesus portrayal	Country
1902	Vie et Passion du Christ	Ferdinand Zecca and Lucien Nonguet	Unknown	France
1906	The Birth, the Life and the Death of Christ	Alice Guy-Blaché and Victorin-Hippolyte Jasset	Édouard Grisollet	France
1907	Vie et Passion du Christ (43 scenes)	Ferdinand Zecca and Lucien Nonguet	Jacques Normand	France
1909	Le Baiser de Judas	Armand Bour and André Calmettes	Jean Mounet-Sully	France
1912	Le Pèlerin	Mario Caserini	Emilio Ghione	Italy
1912	From the Manger to the Cross	Sidney Olcott	Robert Henderson-Bland	United States
1912	Herodiade	Oreste Mentasti	Mario Roncoroni	Italy
1913	La Vie de Notre Seigneur Jésus-Christ	André-Maurice Maître	Unknown	France
1914	The Last Supper	Lorimer Johnston	Sydney Ayres	United States
1916	Intolerance	D. W. Griffith	Howard Gaye	United States
1916	Christus	Giulio Antamoro	Alberto Pasquali	Italy
1917	Judas	Febo Mari	M. Vannoti	Italy
1918	Restitution	Howard Gaye	Howard Gaye	United States
1918	Marie de Magdala	Aldo Molinari	Guido Guiducci	Italy
1919	Redemption	Carmine Gallone	Alberto Pasquali	Italy
1921	Leaves from Satan's Book	Carl Theodor Dreyer	Halvard Hoff	Denmark
1923	I.N.R.I.	Robert Wiene	Gregori Chmara	Germany
1927	The King of Kings	Cecil B. DeMille	H. B. Warner	United States
1927	L'Agonie de Jérusalem	Julien Duvivier	Lionel Salem	France
1928	Jesus of Nazareth	Unknown	Philip Van Loan	United States
1930	L'Age d'Or	Luis Buñuel	Unknown	France
1935	Golgotha	Julien Duvivier	Robert Le Vigan	France
1942	Jesus of Nazareth	José Díaz Morales	José Cibrián	Mexico
1946	Maria de Magdala	Miguel Contreras Torres	Luis Alcoriza	Mexico
1948	Reina de reinas: La Virgen María	Miguel Contreras Torres	Luis Alcoriza	Mexico
1950	Mater dei	Emilio Cordero	Giorgio Constantini	Italy
1951	The Living Christ Series	John T. Coyle	Robert Wilson	United States
1952	The Martyr of Calvary	Miguel Morayta	Enrique Rambal	Spain
1953	The Robe	Henry Koster	Donald C. Klune	United States
1953	I Beheld His Glory (TV)	John T. Coyle	Robert Wilson	United States
1954	Day of Triumph	John T. Coyle	Robert Wilson	United States
1954	Le Fils de l'homme	Virgilio Sabel	Eugenio Valenti	Italy
1954	El beso de Judas	Rafael Gil	Gabriel Alcover	Spain
1958	The Power of the Resurrection	Harold D. Schuster	Jon Shepodd	United States
1959	Ben-Hur	William Wyler	Claude Heater	United States
1961	King of Kings	Nicholas Ray	Jeffrey Hunter	United States
1961	Barabbas	Richard Fleischer	Roy Mangano	Italy / United States
1963	Acto da Primavera	Manoel de Oliveira	Nicolau Nunes Da Silva	Portugal
1963	La ricotta	Pier Paolo Pasolini	Unknown	Italy
1964	The Gospel According to St. Matthew	Pier Paolo Pasolini	Enrique Irazoqui	Italy
1965	The Greatest Story Ever Told	George Stevens	Max von Sydow	United States
1969	The Milky Way	Luis Buñuel	Bernard Verley	France / West Germany / Italy
1971	Jesús, nuestro Señor	Miguel Zacarías	Claudio Brook	Mexico
1973	Gospel Road: A Story of Jesus	Robert Elfstrom	Robert Elfstrom	United States
1973	Jesus Christ Superstar	Norman Jewison	Ted Neeley	United States
1973	Godspell	David Greene	Victor Garber	United States
1975	The Messiah	Roberto Rossellini	Pier Maria Rossi	Italy
1977	Jesus of Nazareth (TV)	Franco Zeffirelli	Robert Powell	Italy / United Kingdom
1978	La Passion (TV)	Raoul Sangla	Alain Claessens	France
1979	Jesus	Peter Sykes / John Krish	Brian Deacon	United States
1979	In Search of Historic Jesus	Henning Schellerup	John Rubinstein	United States
1979	Monty Python's Life of Brian	Terry Jones	Kenneth Colley	United Kingdom
1980	The Day Christ Died (TV)	James Cellan Jones	Chris Sarandon	United States
1981	The Thief	Pasquale Festa Campanile	Claudio Cassinelli	Italy
1981	History of the World, Part I	Mel Brooks	John Hurt	United States
1985	A.D. (TV)	Stuart Cooper	Michael Wilding Jr.	United States
1987	Child Called Jesus (TV)	Franco Rossi	Alessandro Gassmann	Italy
1987–2005	The Animated Stories from the New Testament	Richard Rich	Ivan Crosland	United States
1988	The Last Temptation of Christ	Martin Scorsese	Willem Dafoe	United States
1989	Jesus of Montreal	Denys Arcand	Lothaire Bluteau	Canada
1991	Johannes-Passion	Hugo Niebeling	Christoph Quest	Germany
1993	Visual Bible: Matthew	Regardt van den Bergh	Bruce Marchiano	South Africa
1995	Marie de Nazareth	Jean Delannoy	Didier Bienaimé	France
1999	Mary, Mother of Jesus (TV)	Kevin Connor	Christian Bale	United States
1999	Jesus (TV)	Roger Young	Jeremy Sisto	United States
1999	Jésus (TV)	Serge Moati	Arnaud Giovaninetti	France
2000	Jesus Christ Superstar (TV)	Gale Edwards	Glenn Carter	United States
2000	The Miracle Maker	Derek W. Hayes and Stanislav Sokolov	Ralph Fiennes	United Kingdom / Russia

=== 21st century ===
Year	Title	Director	Jesus portrayal	Country
2001	The Cross (TV)	Lance Tracy	Larry Salberg	United States
2001	Judas (TV)	Raffaele Mertes	Danny Quinn	United States
2001	Close to Jesus: Thomas (TV)	Raffaele Mertes	Danny Quinn	United States
2003	The Gospel of John	Philip Saville	Henry Ian Cusick	Canada / United Kingdom
2003	Maria - Mãe do Filho de Deus	Moacyr Góes	Luigi Baricelli	Brazil
2004	Judas (TV)	Charles Robert Carner	Jonathan Scarfe	United States
2004	The Passion of the Christ	Mel Gibson	Jim Caviezel	United States / Italy
2006	La sacra famiglia (TV)	Raffaele Mertes	Brando Pacitto	Italy
2013	The Bible (TV)	Roma Downey and Mark Burnett	Diogo Morgado	United States
2014	Son of God	Christopher Spencer	Diogo Morgado	United States
2015	Story of Judas	Rabah Ameur-Zaïmeche	Nabil Djedouani	France
2015	A.D. The Bible Continues (TV)	Roma Downey and Mark Burnett	Juan Pablo Di Pace	United States
2016	Risen	Kevin Reynolds	Cliff Curtis	United States
2016	The Real O'Neals (TV)	David Windsor and Casey Johnson	Jeremy Lawson	United States
2016	Ben-Hur	Timur Bekmambetov	Rodrigo Santoro	United States
2017	The Chosen (TV series)	Dallas Jenkins	Jonathan Roumie	United States
2018	Mary Magdalene	Garth Davis	Joaquin Phoenix	United Kingdom
2025	The King of Kings	Seong-ho Jang	Oscar Isaac	United States
