= William Tell (disambiguation) =

William Tell is a hero in Swiss legend.

William Tell may also refer to:

- William Tell (play), a drama by Friedrich Schiller
  - William Tell (opera), by Gioacchino Rossini, based on Schiller's play
    - William Tell Overture, from Rossini's opera
- William Tell (musician), a rock artist
- William Tell (aerial gunnery competition), a fighter aircraft tournament

== Literature ==
- William Tell (1825 play), a play by the Irish writer James Sheridan Knowles
- William Tell, a 1996 children's book by author and illustrator Leonard Everett Fisher

== Film and television ==
- Adventures of William Tell, a French film (1898)
- William Tell (1903 film), a French film
- William Tell (1923 film), a German film
- William Tell (1934 film), a Swiss-German film
- William Tell (1949 film), an Italian film
- William Tell (1956 film), an Austrian film featuring Albin Skoda
- William Tell (1960 film), a Swiss film
- William Tell (2024 film), a British-Italian film
- The Adventures of William Tell, a 1958-59 British television series
- William Tell/The Adventures of William Tell, a 1987-89 multinational television series released in the UK as Crossbow
- The New Adventures of William Tell, a 1992 animated television film produced by Burbank Animation Studios
- The Legend of William Tell, a 1998 New Zealand television series
- The Story of William Tell, a 1953 unfinished film starring Errol Flynn

== See also ==
- Guillaume Tell (disambiguation)
- Guillermo Tell (1929), a painting by Surrealist painter Salvador Dalí in which represents his ongoing conflict with his father
