= The Palace of the Arabian Nights =

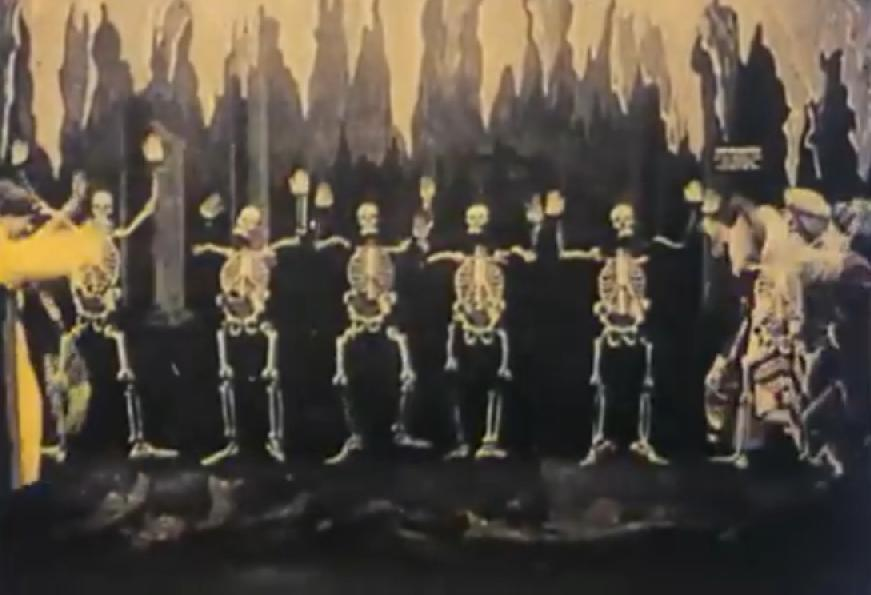
- A scene from the film
- Directed by: Georges Méliès
- Written by: Georges Méliès
- Based on: One Thousand and One Nights
- Produced by: Georges Méliès
- Production company: Star Film Company
- Release date: 1905
- Running time: 440 meters (approx. 28 minutes)
- Country: France
- Language: Silent

The Palace of the Arabian Nights (French: Le Palais des mille et une nuits) is a 1905 silent fantasy film directed by Georges Méliès. The film, inspired by the One Thousand and One Nights, follows the adventures of a prince whose bravery and devotion are tested in a magical quest to win the hand of his beloved.

== Plot ==
The Palace of the Arabian Nights (1905)

In a mythical Arabian kingdom, the noble but penniless Prince Sourire (French for "smile") loves the beautiful Princess Indigo, and asks his father, a mighty Rajah, for her hand in marriage. (Note: The film is silent and has no intertitles, but for his longer films such as this one, Méliès prepared abridged versions of his catalogue descriptions, known as boniments, intending them to be read by a narrator during projection of the film to provide additional details to the viewers. Therefore, some details in this summary are taken from Méliès's catalogue description of the film. The original French proper names are taken from Jack Zipes's discussion of the film; in his English-language catalogues, Méliès used different names for some characters, calling the prince "Prince Charming," the princess "Aouda," and the userer "Holdfast.") The Rajah angrily sends the Prince away; he has already promised Indigo's hand to an old friend of his, the wealthy usurer Sakaram. Indigo protests vehemently as Sourire is driven away by guards.

Returning to his private chamber, Sourire weeps with grief and accidentally overturns an incense burner. Smoke pours out of the burner, from which appears the sorcerer Khalafar. After hearing the prince's story, the sorcerer takes him under his protection and presents him with a magic sword, promising that if the prince is courageous and determined, the sorcerer will lead him to an abundant treasure that will allow him to win his love. Sourire willingly agrees and sets off on the adventure, followed soon after by his friends, who wish to stop him from doing anything foolhardy.

Arriving in a temple, the prince falls to his knees in supplication at an altar to a goddess, Siva (presumably inspired by the Hindu deity Siva). The statue of the goddess above the altar comes miraculously to life and sends Sourire off in an ornate boat driven by a blue dwarf. The boat navigates a sacred river and brings Sourire to an impenetrable forest, which magically opens up to reveal secret caverns guarded by a Fairy of Gold. Sourire and his friends descend into a Crystal Grotto, where their courage is tested by attacks from genii of fire, will-o'-the-wisps, phantom skeletons, a fire-breathing dragon, and a flock of monstrous toads. Sourire remains steadfast and puts the monsters to flight. Khalafar appears and congratulates the prince for passing the trial period; he will now be rewarded for his efforts. Sourire is led into the Palace of the Arabian Nights and given an enormous treasure.

Back in the Rajah's kingdom, the day of Indigo's marriage to Sakaram has arrived. Just as the two are about to be married in the palace courtyard, trumpets sound and Prince Sourire appears, bedecked in his newly found finery and followed by a procession revealing his riches. The astounded Rajah allows Indigo to marry Sourire at last. The delighted crowd casts Sakaram out of the courtyard and celebrates the marriage of the Prince and Princess.

== Production ==
Though clearly inspired by the One Thousand and One Nights, the plot of the film is not taken from any single story in that collection; rather, Méliès combined the visual iconography of the work and elements from various stories, including the liberated genie from the folk tale of Aladdin, into an original adventure narrative that would allow ample scope for spectacle and special effects. The result is a simple story full of exotic settings and spectacular moments, highly reminiscent of the plots of féeries, spectacular French stage productions popular in the nineteenth century.

Méliès appears in the film as the sorcerer Khalafar. One of Méliès's costume sketches lists the other actors he planned to cast: "Mlles Calvière, Bodson, Billuart et Pelletier. MM. Docky, d'Hubert, Dufresne, etc." (Note: Jeanne Calvière, a stablewoman at the Cirque d'Hiver, was hired to play the title role in Méliès's Joan of Arc in 1900, after which she remained among his core troupe of actors for some years. Mademoiselle Bodson (whose first name is unknown) appears in Méliès's A Miracle Under the Inquisition (1904), The Eclipse, or the Courtship of the Sun and Moon (1907), and The Dream of an Opium Fiend (1908). The costume sketch in question is reproduced in Georges Méliès mage, by Maurice Bessy and Lo Duca (Paris: Pauvert, 1961), p. 102.)

The Palace of the Arabian Nights was the second Méliès film, after The Barber of Seville (1904), to be longer than 400 meters. The film, one of Méliès's most opulently designed, is notable for a stronger emphasis on spectacle, and slightly more relaxed pace, than Méliès's earlier films had shown; this change of style may have been influenced by Edwin S. Porter's 1903 film version of Uncle Tom's Cabin or by the lavish historical dramas then in vogue among Italian filmmakers.

To costume his film, Méliès took advantage of the availability of a sizable stock of costumes he had purchased the same year from a bankrupt stage costuming house, the Maison Lepère. The film's numerous props include almost all of those that had previously been seen, or would later be seen, in other Méliès films: thus, the Moorish door for the Temple of Gold was borrowed from The Human Fly (1902), the puppet dragon returns in The Witch (1906), the ruins reappear in Sightseeing Through Whisky (1907), and so on. The Palace of the Arabian Nights itself, painted in trompe l'oeil style on a flat backdrop, looks exactly like the salle de glaces (hall of mirrors) featured at the Paris Exposition of 1900. (A very similar room was established more permanently in Paris six years later, as part of the Musée Grevin.)

Along with the lavish costumes and scenery, another main focus of the film is the spectacular special effects. Méliès's techniques for creating these effects included stage machinery, pyrotechnics, substitution splices, superimpositions, and dissolves. The transparency effect of phantom skeletons was created through multiple exposure, with the images of the fighting protagonists and the ghostly skeletons recorded over each other so that both would be visible. Méliès's catalogue description for the film shows particular pride in the scene in which an apparently impenetrable forest, painted on flats arranged to show depth of space, magically parts to reveal a temple: "This decoration which was made only after considerable labor is a veritable marvel of achievement. It possesses a great artistic beauty."

== Release and reception ==
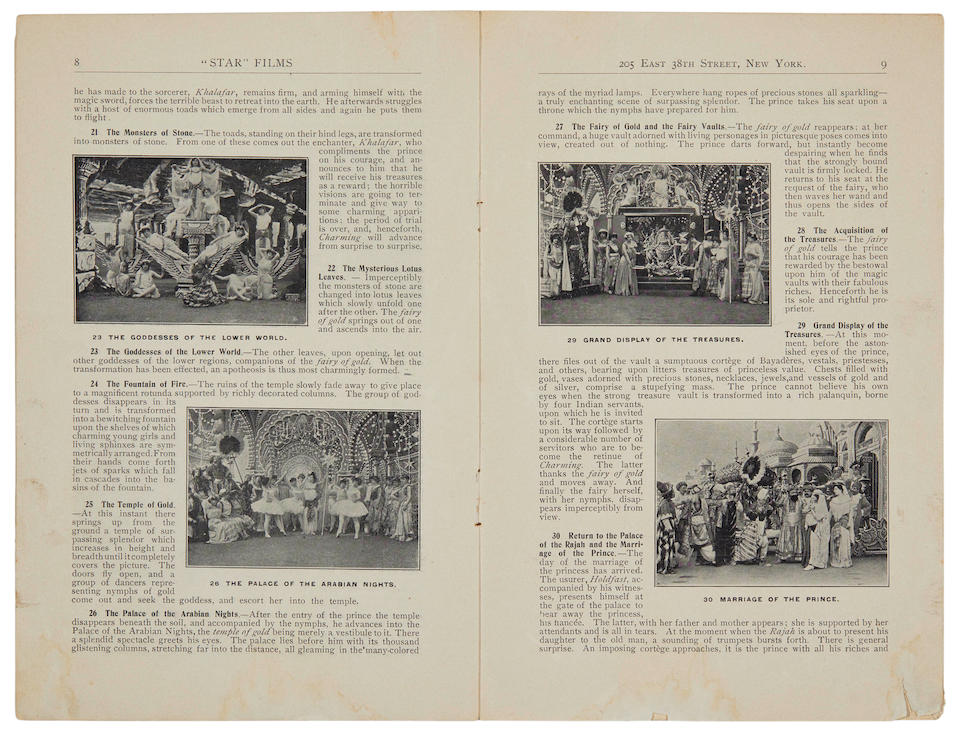
Pages from Méliès's promotional leaflet for the film

The film was released by Méliès's Star Film Company and is numbered 705–726 in its catalogues, where it was advertised as a grande féerie orientale nouvelle. Both a complete print running 28 minutes and an abridged version running 22 minutes were sold by Méliès; both versions were available in either black-and-white or hand-colored prints. (The running times listed in Méliès's catalogues indicate that he intended a frame rate of 14 frames per second for the film.)

In a study of cinematic depictions of Arabic culture, the writer Jack Shaheen criticizes The Palace of the Arabian Nights for including some of the imagery that would become stereotypical in Hollywood versions of the Middle East, citing the opening scene in which "submissive maidens attend a bored, greedy, black-bearded potentate" while "a stocky palace guard cools the ruler" with a giant fan. By contrast, the historian Robert Irwin, in an essay on Méliès's film and other screen versions of the One Thousand and One Nights, argues that "not too much should be made" of this stereotyping, saying that "film-makers have treated British medieval history in a similarly cavalier fashion in films about the adventures of Robin Hood, while a fantasy history of the Old West has been conjured up by the thousands of cowboy films made in Hollywood."

Film critic William B. Parrill, reviewing silent films in the 2010s, highlighted the skeleton fight scene, saying it "foreshadows similar and not necessarily more imaginative scenes in the films of Ray Harryhausen". Academic theorist Antonia Lant, in an analysis of haptics in cinema, lauded the scene with the magically parting forest, writing: "Melies chose motifs that probed or highlighted the alluring yet illusory depths of the cinema, the impossible compressions and expansions of far and near, the unclear identities of figure and ground." Cultural historian Richard Abel highlighted that the cultural milieu evoked by Méliès "turns into a kind of world tour, eclectically combining" various real and imaginary exotic locations across the Middle East and Asia, "and, in a clever twist that exposes the mask of the 'other' and its dangers, the Palace of the Arabian Nights, where the treasure is hidden, turns out to look much like the Musée Grévin in Paris."
