= Au Pays Noir =

1905 French silent short film

Au pays noir
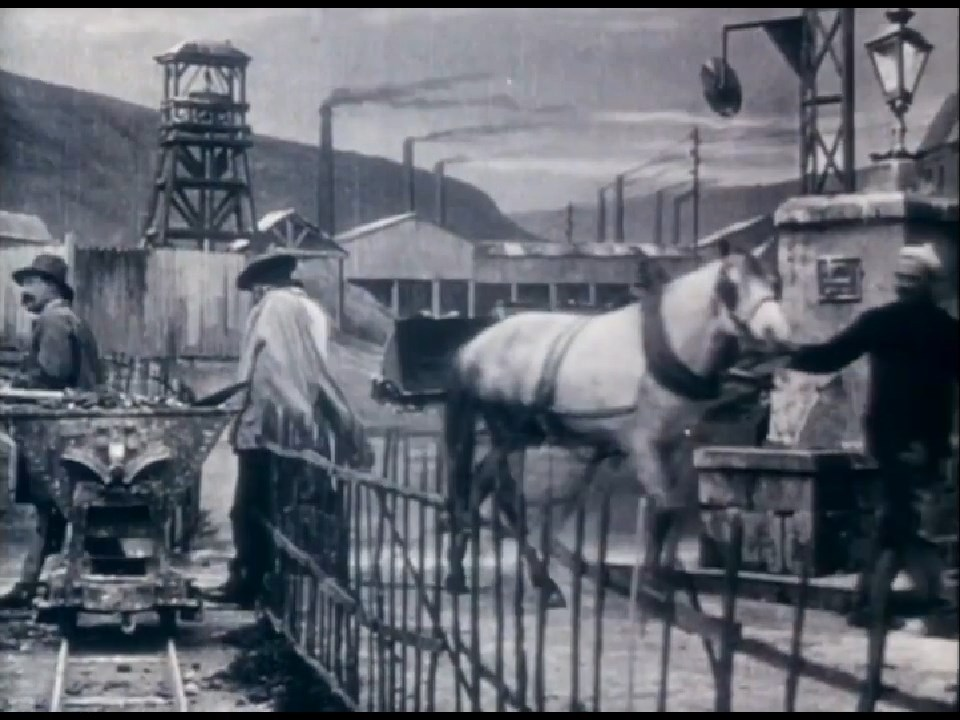
- Directed by: Ferdinand Zecca, Lucien Nonguet
- Production company: Pathé Frères
- Distributed by: Pathé Company
- Release date: 1905
- Running time: 13 minutes
- Country: France

Au pays noir is a 1905 French silent short film directed by Ferdinand Zecca and Lucien Nonguet, and distributed in English-speaking countries under the titles In the Mining District (World-wide, English title), Down in the Coal Mines (United States) and Tragedy in a Coal Mine (United Kingdom). The film is inspired on Emile Zola's novel Germinal.

== Plot ==
The film shows the hard and dangerous job a coal miner is forced to do, painfully earning his life and that of his family, lost, half of his miserable existence, in the depths of the earth, exposed to the terrible disasters produced by the fulgurating explosions of firedamp, the sudden irruption of water that invades the shafts and galleries, ripping open the walls of the mine, tearing away the woodwork in its irresistible rush.

== Production ==
The film was shot at the new studio of Pathé in Montreuil, on decors painted by Vincent Lorant-Heilbronn (fr). Some of the sets were large enough to allow pans up to 180°. In addition, in the two copies of Au pays noir that survive, two shots showing "actualité footage of real rescue teams preparing to descend into the mine" were inserted.

== Analysis ==
The film starts with a medium shot of a miner working lying down in a low galerie. It is followed by 8 scenes introduced by an intertitle (in italics below). Most scenes are composed of one single wide shot. Panning is used in scenes 2 and 5. The explosion and the rescue scenes include several shots. Scene 7 includes an intertitle in the middle of the shot. The shots showing the inside of the mine are tinted yellow before the explosion to evoke the miners' lights and blue afterwards.

Opening shot: A miner working lying in a very low gallery.

1. The miner's home. Set of a kitchen with a poor family having breakfast.

2. On the way to the pit. Set of a village with worker houses and the entrance to the mine. A man and his son walk to the mine after having said goodbye to their family. They meet other workers on the way. The camera pans 180° left to follow the protagonists from their house to the mine.

3. The entrance to the mine. A coal wagon is drawn by a horse and pushed by male and female workers. The workers enter the mine after saluting an overseer who notes their names. A woman and a child pick the coal that has fallen from the wagon.

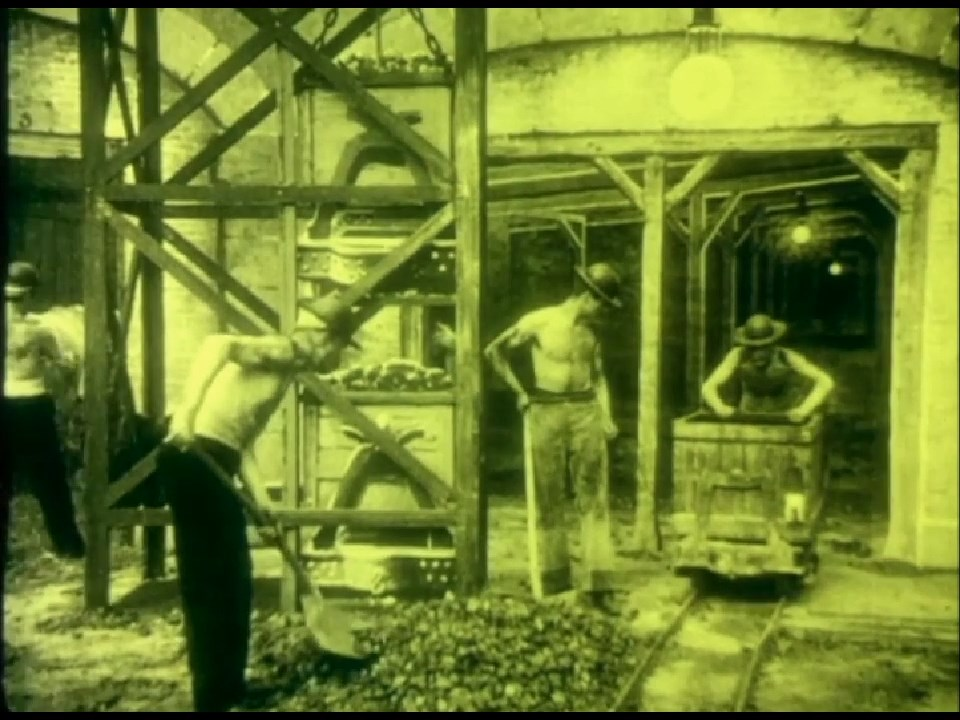
In the tunnels

4. The descent. Set representing the interior of the mine. A two floor elevator is filled with horses at the bottom level and men at the top level and slowly goes down.

5. In the tunnels. Set representing a coal elevator at the crossing of several mining tunnels. Workers load a wagon with coal before it goes up. The camera pans 90° left to show the tunnel where men are extracting the coal. A horse draws a wagon full of coal. The men take a break for lunch.

6. A firedamp explosion. Set representing another mining tunnel. Workers are extracting coal when there is an explosion and the mine is flooded by torrents of water. 08:26. Other view of the tunnel. Water keeps gushing in and the body of a worker is thrown on the ground.

7. Overcome by the deluge. Other view of the flooded tunnel with the corpse of a horse in the background. Two workers wade in the water and manage to reach a dry spot. 09:10. The saviors. Continuation of shot 7. Two rescuers come down and bring up the workers.

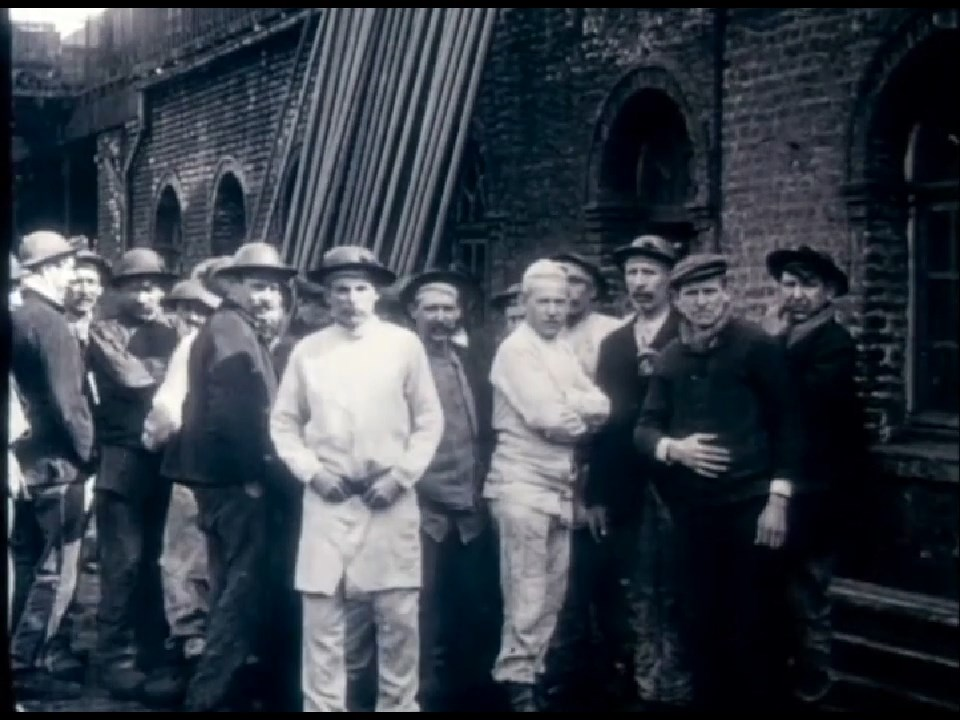
Archive footage

8. The rescue. Two shots filmed on location showing workers at a mine (probably archive footage) followed by a shot of a set showing the exit of a mine ventilation shaft used to rescue the workers, with a painted background of the mining installations. Rescuers are pulling out workers from the shaft while families are kept away by the police. Dead bodies are laid on a mattress of straw. The man seen in shots 1 and 2 recognises the corpse of his son. Between anger and despair he calls his wife and children to come and mourn with him.

This is the second film adapting some parts of Emile Zola's 1885 novel Germinal, after the 1904 film The Strike, also directed by Ferdinand Zecca.

In its presentation of the film, Pathé insisted about the realism of the film, stating that while nobody ignores how hard and dangerous the work of coal miners is, not everybody knows "the daily scenes that take place in the private life and in the work of the miners. It is all this that we have scrupulously studied for our clients and faithfully reproduced for the public. In short, it is the whole daily life of the miner that we describe, since step by step the cinematographic views will show him at the beginning of his day of hard work, at home, then in the village and finally in the extraction pits."

The film has indeed been quoted as one of the films portraying various elements of a mining landscape now disappeared, reflecting a bygone temporality and immortalizing "the representations of the society over the course of successive decades".

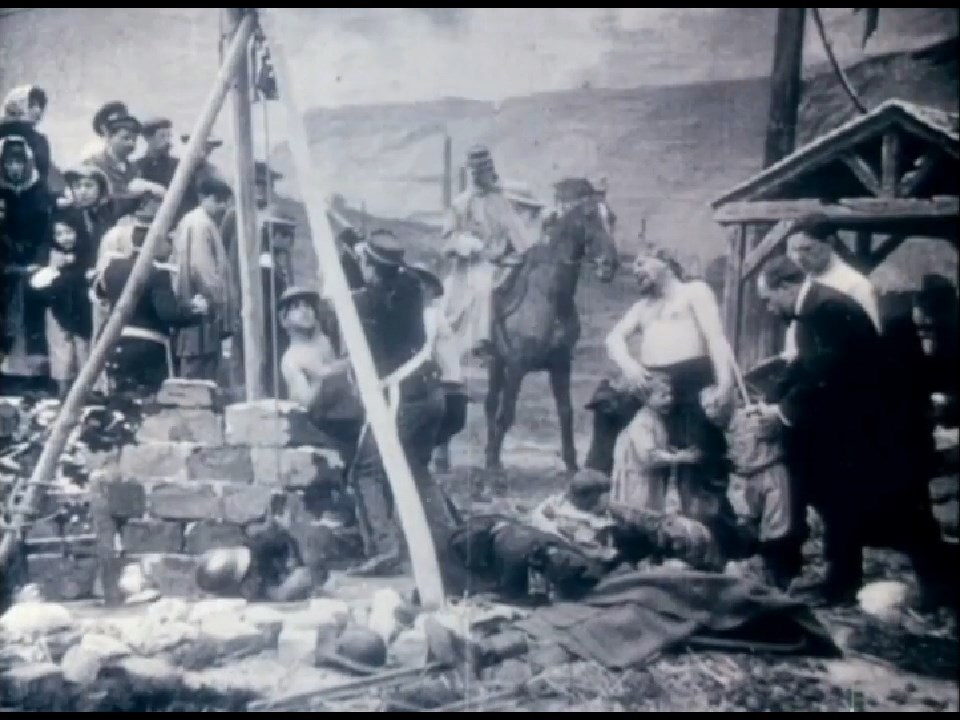
Final scene

Richard Abel wrote that Au pays noir was "one of Pathé's more popular films during the summer of 1905 (and yet one of the last to depict male working-class conditions for several years)" and includes detailed tableaux representing a working-class milieu. Referring to scenes 2, On the way to the pit, and 5, In the tunnels, he considers that the "principal attraction of the film (...) - and a Pathé trademark by then - is the 180-degree pan across a painted panorama which follows a group of miners (...) from their houses through the town square to the mine entrance, and the 90-degree pan (...) across the deep-space tunnels leading off from a central shaft underground". Regarding the last scene, he remarks that "although the film clearly valorizes the patriarchal family bonds, this tragic "tableau" - the very antithesis of the féerie of historical film's apotheosis ending - strongly suggests that the working-class men (and women) endure suffering simply in "the order of things".
