= Guillaume Tell (disambiguation) =

Guillaume Tell is the French name for Swiss folk hero William Tell.

Guillaume Tell can also refer to:

- Guillaume Tell (Grétry), a French comic opera of the 18th century
- Guillaume Tell (athlete), a French Olympian of the 1920s
- Guillaume Tell (1795), a French warship of the Revolutionary period
- Guillaume Tell et le Clown ("The Adventures of William Tell"), a French short film of 1898 featuring trick photography

== See also ==
- William Tell (disambiguation)
