= Max Takes a Bath =

1910 French silent film

- French: Max prend un bain
- Directed by: Lucien Nonguet
- Starring: Max Linder
- Release date: 1910
- Running time: 7 minutes
- Country: France
- Language: Silent

Max Takes a Bath (Max prend un bain), also known by the title By the Doctor's Orders, is a French silent film directed by Lucien Nonguet and produced by the Pathé Frères company in 1910. This film, approximately seven minutes long, popularized many trends in French cinema, such as the vertical vantage point. Max Takes a Bath also marks the start of the actor Max Linder's popularity; Max Linder was one of the earliest film stars, and is widely credited for his effect on comedy.

== Plot ==
Max Takes a Bath (1910)

Max is in a doctor's office where he gets a prescription to take a cold bath every day for one month in order to treat his nervous twitching. After this, it cuts immediately to Max leaving a shop with a new bathtub that he struggles to carry. He attempts to call a carriage but is denied, and forced to carry the bathtub himself back to his apartment. Once he has the tub in his apartment, he begins to use a pitcher to fill it with water, however when he carries it back into the room he trips, spilling the water, and stands back up throwing the glass pitcher to the floor in frustration and shattering it. He then attempts to use a decanter and drinking glass to fill the tub. Ultimately, he gives up and drags the tub into the hall, once he has it filled it is too heavy to bring back into his room so he undresses and gets in the tub while it's still in the hallway. Another tenant tries to get in the bath, prompting other tenants to realize Max is bathing in the hallway. The authorities get involved, them and the tenants carrying the tub, with Max still in it, to the station where an argument ensues. The tub gets flipped over in the disagreement and Max flees the scene carrying the tub on him similarly to how he transported it in the beginning scenes, and a comedic chase scene begins. A trope that would become commonplace in the comedy genre of early silent films. During this sequence, viewers watch the famous scene of Max scaling a building still under the tub and the authorities subsequently following. Ultimately, Max reaches the roof and escapes through a hatch, throwing the tub down and knocking all of the authorities down.

== Production ==
=== Optical effects ===
In this film, Lucien Nonguet uses two optical effects one being a vertical vantage point for the scenes where the bathtub and people are moving up and down a wall, and the other being a close-up of Max's face. The close-up happened first when Max was taking his bath in the hallway and the camera is up close to Max to the point where the audience could only see Max's face. A close-up helps display the most detail possible, and in this case it allowed the audience to get a very detailed look on Max's face.This close-up was used to see Max's emotions and reactions when taking his bath to get rid of his problem of twitching. At the end of the film, a vertical vantage point was used when Max was trying to escape the police. A vertical vantage point is where the camera is held directly vertical from the ground, making it seem like the ground is actually a wall facing us. The vertical vantage point was first used in the film L'Homme-Mouche or The Human Fly where Georges Méliès has an acrobat dancing and doing tricks on the wall. In Max Takes a Bath, Nonguet uses a vertical vantage point first when the police is chasing max and his bathtub up the wall and finally when the bathtub is falling from the top of the building and in the process taking out the police trying to catch Max.

=== Costume design ===
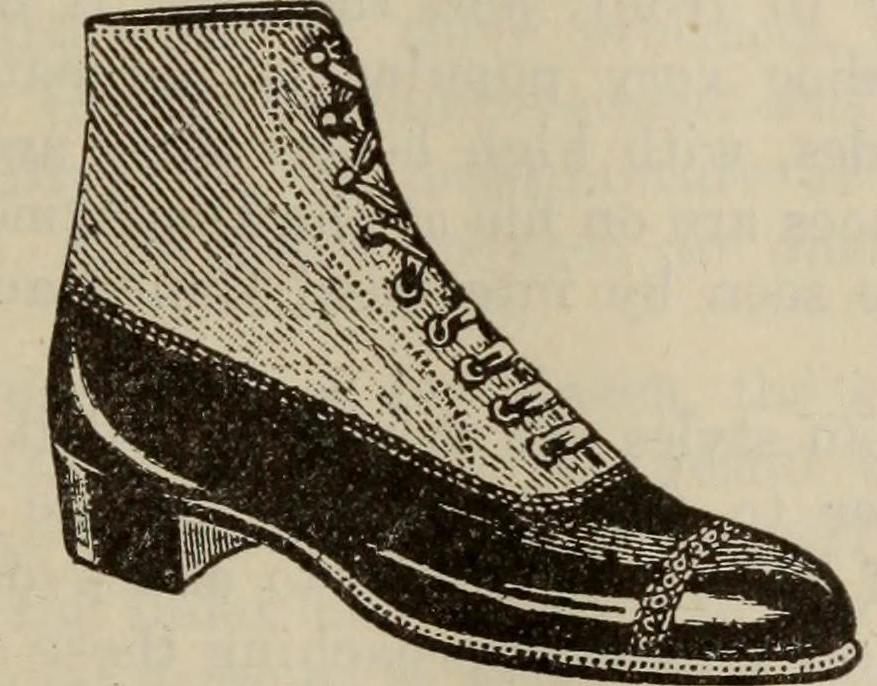
Balmoral boot

This time period began the Modernism of previously established fashion trends. Department stores and shopping centers began catering to men's potential as consumers. Men during this time period began experimenting more with clothing and finding their own style.

Max Takes a Bath's costume design follows French male fashion trends of the time. Hats and suits were widely worn by people who could afford them. In the film, Max wears a top hat, even during chase scenes; its silky material is representative of Max's upper-class status. Due to wearing high-rise trousers characteristic of the setting, Max's Morning Coat is only tall enough to cover his waistband. In addition to this, Max can be seen wearing the Balmoral boot, which was laced high above the ankle, and was popular for men at the time. Balmorals have higher heels than other boots, due to the amount of waste in urban France during the early 20th century.

=== Set design ===
Max Takes a Bath was shot at Pathé Studios using several sets. At the start of the film, Max receives his diagnosis from the doctor in his office. The majority of the film takes place in the hallway of Max's apartment (he is forced to bathe in the hallway due to not having any water spouts in his room.) The scene is shot facing the side of the bathtub, which allows the audience to see a staircase. The last set is the police station, which Max scales with the bathtub to escape the police.

=== Silent film acting ===
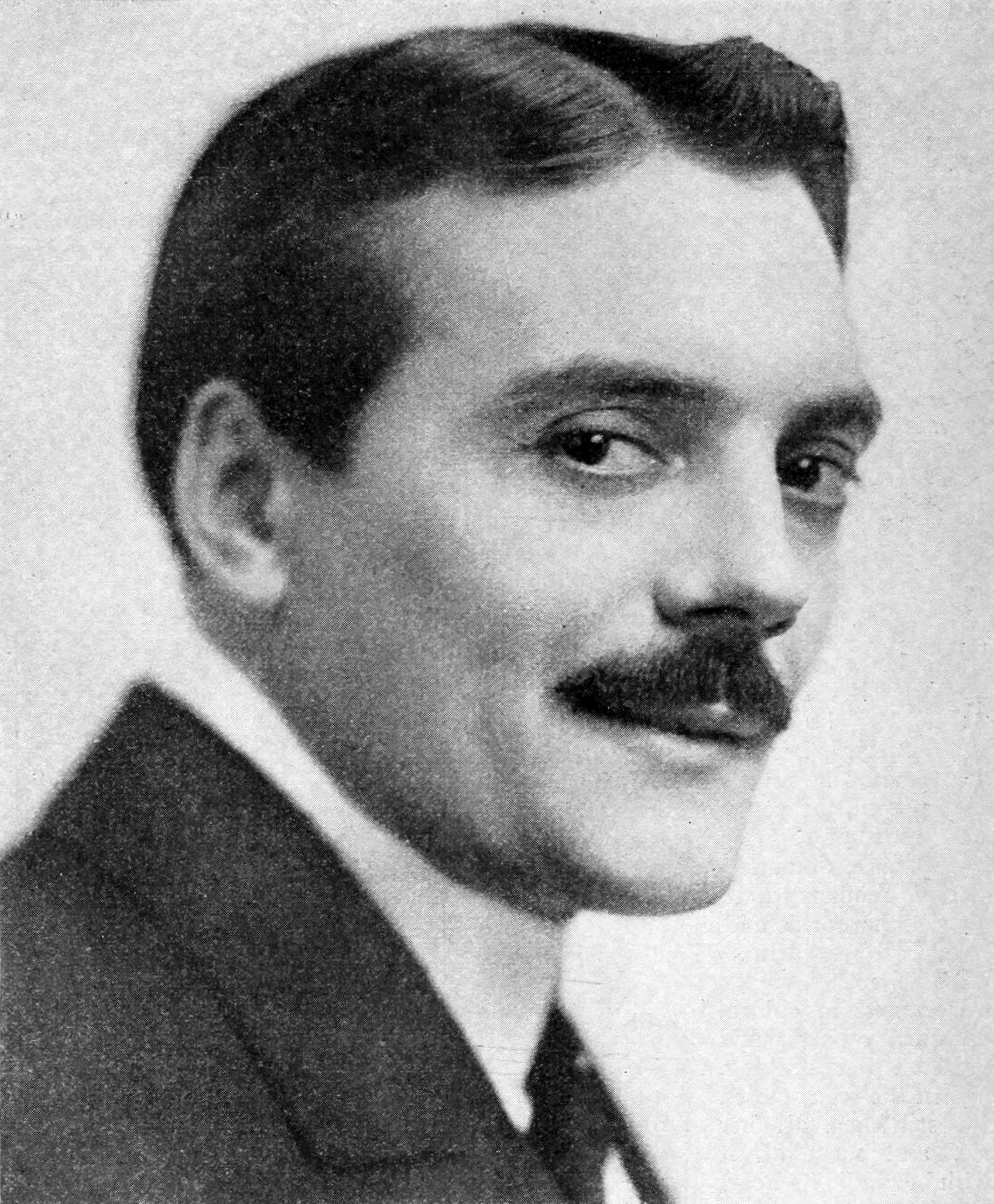
Profile Max Linder from the Photoplay Magazine Publishing Company

In this time period, silent films were a unique art form of storytelling that was encapsulated by the elaborate form of silent film acting that required actors to convey exaggerated physical gestures and to convey complex emotions and narratives without the usage of dialogue. With limited intertitles, it was important for actors to portray the wide range of emotions through excessive facial expressions and body language. This era created a form of stylized acting with grand gestures and melodramatic expressions to enable the audience to understand the character's expression of feelings and context of the scene that is being portrayed.

In this film, the actor does small excessive body movement of shrugging his shoulders for the narrative that he has a nervous trait that he is attempting to cure. His movements in certain instances seem almost mechanical with the way he attempts to fill up his bathtub and through his usage of raising his eyebrows and moving his arms in a wide range movement. These are prime examples of a methodical way of acting that enabled the viewer to see what range of emotions the character is experiencing and interpret the context to what they might be thinking. When Max is arrested, the arm movements he expresses are those of confusion and panic as he feels he is being wrongfully arrested while he is carried out in the bathtub to the police station. The Police officers as well display exaggerated movements through their arms to showcase the disagreement that is taking place in the film in order to convey the discourse that is transpiring between Max, the other tenants, and the Police. Even with consistent head turning and hand gestures, these were all imperative techniques that were executed to get the context of the scene across to the audience.

== Theme of class structure ==
During this time period, many of the films Max Linder were a part of contained themes of class structure. As Linder's films were comical, they typically had Linder playing a character that belonged to social structures that reflected the petit bourgeois or bourgeoisie, and Max Takes a Bath showcases these themes clearly with Max pursuing the pleasures someone in those social classes would want. With Max playing the main character in the film Max Takes a Bath, he is tasked with fixing his hiccups through the use of taking baths. By getting this order from a doctor, Max originally did not own a bathtub, so he goes out and purchases a new porcelain bathtub. Historically, the time this film released, it was a new feasible endeavor for members of the working class and middle class to obtain bathroom related fixtures. In the film, Max places the bathtub in his room as it appears there was not an actual bathroom within the apartment, and he obtains the water for the bath from a water spout outside of his apartment. It was not uncommon for the working class or middle class to have just one or an incomplete set of bathroom fixtures at the time. Many of the homes/apartments already built lacked a room devoted for an actual bathroom as it would be expensive to build a new room and buy all the needed bathroom fixtures all at once.
