= Don Quixote (1903 film) =

1903 French silent short film

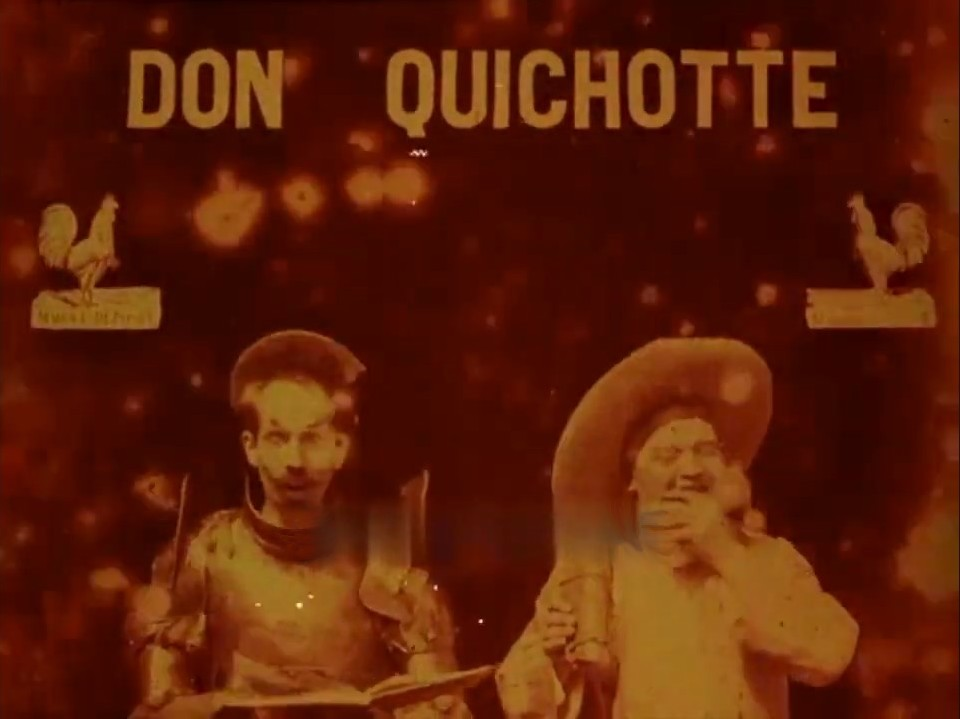
- Opening scene
- French: Don Quichotte
- Directed by: Ferdinand Zecca and Lucien Nonguet
- Cinematography: Ferdinand Zecca
- Production company: Pathé Frères
- Distributed by: Pathé Company
- Release date: 1903
- Running time: 15 minutes (8 minutes, 1904 re-release)
- Country: France

Don Quixote (French: Don Quichotte), also known as Adventures of the Ingenious Hidalgo Don Quixote, is a 1903 French silent short film directed by Ferdinand Zecca and Lucien Nonguet. The film is the oldest surviving cinematographic adaptation of the eponymous novel by Miguel de Cervantes.

== Plot ==
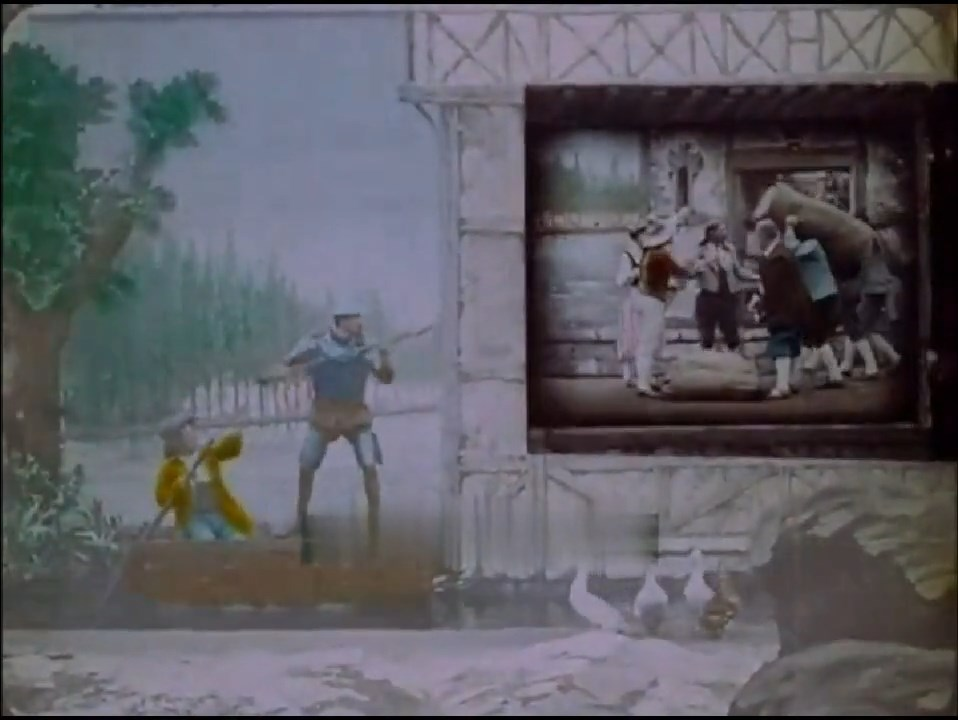
Drowning in the Ebro River

The film is described in the Pathé catalogue as a Grand comic scene in 15 tableaux from the Romance by Cervantes. 1. Scene: He starts out to defend the oppressed. 2. Scene: Thrashed, Knighted. 3. Scene: Fight against the windmills. 4. Scene: Imaginary foes. 5. Scene: Receiving the thanks of liberated convicts. 6. Scene: Sancho loses his Ass. 7. Scene: Fight against leather wine bottles. 8. Scene: Gamaches wedding feast. 9. Scene: He smashes the Marionettes. 10. Scene: Drowning in the Ebre. 11. Scene: Enchantment of Dulcinee. 12. Scene: A knight's test. 13. Scene: Sancho Pansa as Governor. 14. Scene: The Tournament. 15. Scene: Death of Don Quixote.

== Distribution and preservation ==
After its initial release in France in October 1903, the film was exhibited in December 1903 in Washington D.C. (USA). It was further distributed in 1904 in the US, in Germany and in Mexico, and in 1905 in Denmark.

In 1904, Pathé released a shorter version of the film (840 ft. instead of 1420 ft.), including only the best scenes. This seems to be the only version which has been preserved.

== Analysis ==
The preserved version includes eight single-shot scenes.

The opening scene is a red-tinted medium close-up showing the two main protagonists. It is followed by seven wide shots of theatre-like sets introduced by a title card. According to Richard Abel, this may be the earliest surviving Pathé féerie that contains intertitles. Shots two through seven are hand-coloured, using the Pathécolor stencil-based tinting process, and Abel stresses how the coloring plays an important role, in particular with the explosion at the end of the sixth scene and the garish reds and yellows of Sancho's costume in the seventh scene. The final scene, Don Quixote's death, is tinted in a somber blue.

2. Don Quixote's study. Don Quixote sees the heroes of the novels he had been reading threatening him. He sets up to fight them. When he's gone, Sancho gives the books of his library to a group of people who throw most of them away. The scene uses an in-camera matte shot in the upper right corner, to show what Don Quixote believes he is seeing.

3. The comedy infuriated Don Quixote. Don Quixote attends a puppet show, showed as split screen, but he does not like the performance (The end of this scene seems to be lost).

4. Sancho loses his donkey. A mountainous landscape where Don Quixote and Sancho jump around.

5. Drowning in the Ebro River. Don Quixote and Sancho are on a rowing boat in front of a water mill. The scene also uses an in-camera matte shot to show first the inside of the building and then the facade of a castle with a lady brought by guards and kneeling in front of a gentleman. Don Quixote, thinking that he has seen Dulcinea held prisoner wants to go and save her. The split screen scene changes back to the inside of the water mill as Don Quixote and Sancho fall into the river and the mill workers rush out to save them. Richard Abel notes the novelty of the organisation of this composite shot where "the mill workers run left to exit from the matte interior (...) (and) appear just a couple of frames later, and in the order of their exit, on the exterior studio dock, from which they can reach the struggling heroes."

6. Tests of chivalry. Don Quixote and Sancho, after having been made-up in black and white, climb on a pommel horse where they must fight blindfolded. The scene ends with an explosion.

7. Sancho as Governor. Sancho magnificently dressed arrives by rowboat at a ceremony where he is celebrated by a whole court of gentlemen and guards only to be eventually thrown on the ground by the guards and trampled.

8. The death of Don Quixote. Don Quixote lies in bed surrounded by his friends and with Sancho at his side. He dies after a last drink.
