= Assassination of the Grand Duke Serge =

1905 French silent short film

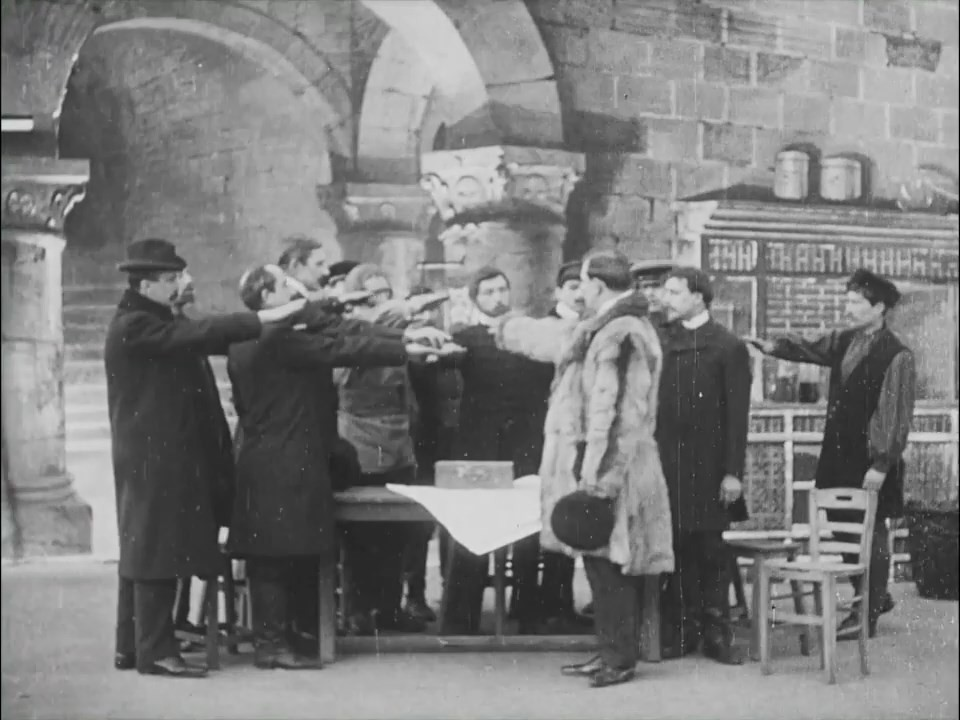
- Opening shot
- French: L'assassinat du grand-duc Serge
- Directed by: Lucien Nonguet
- Production company: Pathé Frères
- Distributed by: Pathé Company
- Release date: 1905
- Running time: 2 minutes
- Country: France

L'assassinat du grand-duc Serge, is a 1905 French silent short film directed by Lucien Nonguet, and distributed in English-speaking countries under the titles Assassination of the Grand Duke Serge and Assassination of the King of Serbia. The film is a docudrama dramatising the re-enactment of the assassination of Grand Duke Sergei Alexandrovich of Russia that had taken place a few months before in Moscow.

== Plot ==
The film is composed of three fixed camera wide shots:

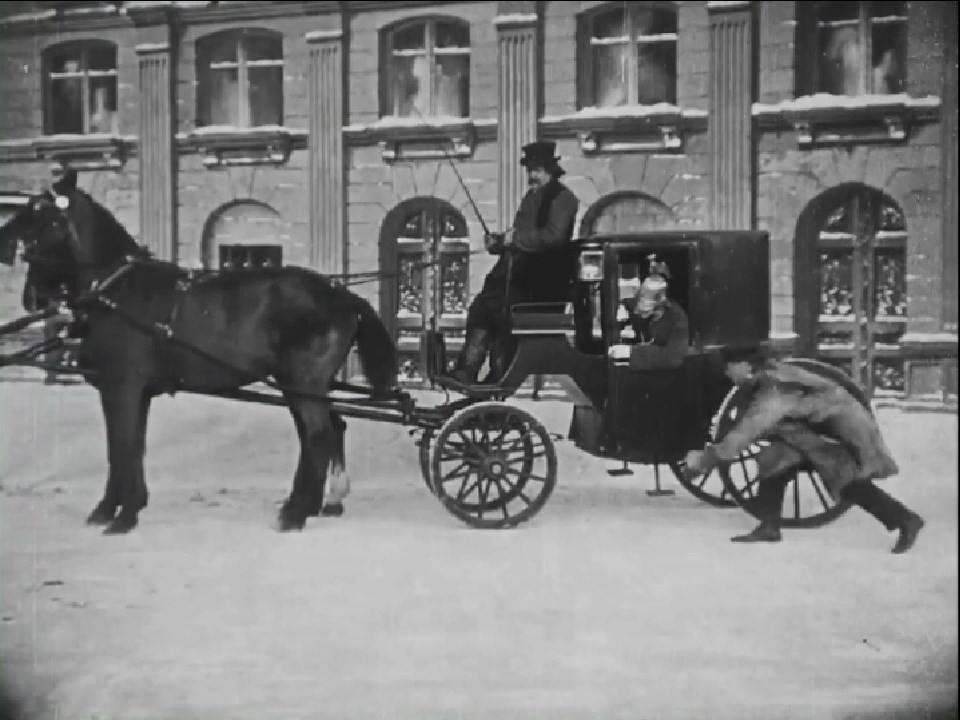
Shot 2

1. An underground vaulted room. group of men talking around a table. In the background, another group of men is mixing chemicals. A man shows a map. Another draws a paper from a box, reads it and points at one of the men wearing a fur coat who stands up and takes an oath. They all swear with him. He is given the bomb. Accompanied by another man, he leaves the room.

2. A snow covered street in front of a palace. Several men walk by. A carriage enters right and stops. The two men seen in shot 1 run towards the carriage and one of them throws the bomb which explodes. Smoke fills the screen.

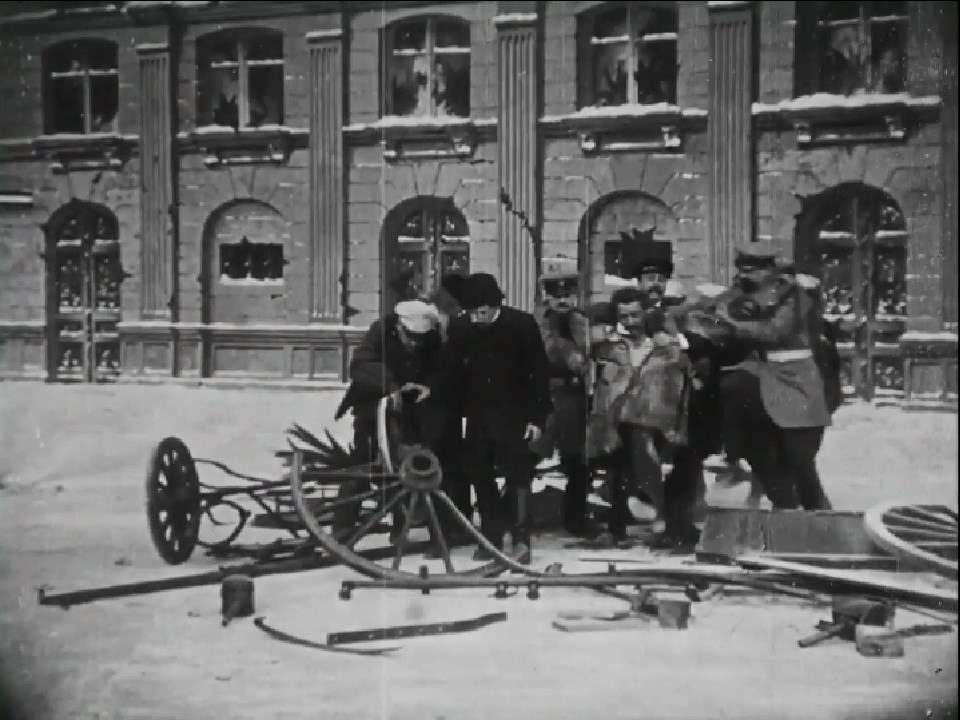
Shot 3

3. When the smoke dissipates the set seen in shot 2 has been transformed with all windows of the buildings broken and broken pieces of the carriage on the ground, with more pieces falling down. A group of people run to the wreck and catch the man with the fur coat.

== Production ==
Since 1903, Lucien Nonguet had been in charge at Pathé Frères of the filming of re-enacted newsreels and had already released in August 1904 a film about a political assassination in Russia, L'assassinat du Ministre Plehve, relating the assassination in July 1904 of Russian Minister of the Interior Vyacheslav von Plehve. The film had met with great public success.

Pictures of the assassination of Grand Duke Sergei Alexandrovich were published in the international press shortly after the event. Lucien Nonguet explained that he based the reconstitution of the murder scene on one of these pictures, using an old horse carriage that he had had dismantled with some pieces broken and partially burned.

A journalist of Le Matin visited the Pathé studio in Vincennes in February 1905 and gave a detailed description of the filming, detailing under the title "People, you are being deceived!" the tricks used to produce re-enacted newsreel, that some viewers might have been regarding as real. The protagonists are not presented in this article as actors but as extras (figurants) and only the nicknames Coco and Bébert are indicated for the two main ones. Lucien Nonguet is not credited as director, but as Head of Extras (chef de la figuration). The journalist describes the assassination scene as follows: "Suddenly the carriage stopped. (...) Then "Coco" rushed in, throwing a box full of nails under the horses' feet. The operator interrupted the operation of the cinematograph. He did not start the machine again until the powder was lit to surround the scene with smoke. The cinematograph was stopped again. The carriage was removed. In its place, old axles, broken wheels, a lantern, and a thousand other things were placed, while the decorators painted cracks on the walls of the monument and drew long breaks on the windows. As the debris of the explosion had to fall down, men perched on the roof let, at a given signal, old bags, cushions, etc. fall down. (...) It is by bringing these films segments together that the illusion of reality is created."

== Release and distribution ==
The film was released in France in February 1905. It was released during the same year by Pathé Frères and by the Kleine Optical Company in the United States, where it was sometimes confused with a 1903 film by Lucien Nonguet, Assassinat de la famille royale de Serbie. The film was also distributed in Japan, where it was often screened with newsreels of the 1905 Russo-Japanese War "to allude to the instability of the Russian political climate."
