= Revolution in Russia =

1905 French silent short film

- The full film
- French: La révolution en Russie
- Directed by: Lucien Nonguet
- Production company: Pathé Frères
- Distributed by: Pathé Company
- Release date: 1905
- Running time: 5 minutes
- Country: France

La révolution en Russie, also known as Les événements d'Odessa and La révolte du cuirassée Potemkine, is a 1905 French silent short film directed by Lucien Nonguet, and distributed in English-speaking countries under the titles Revolution in Russia and Revolution in Odessa. The film dramatises the re-enactment of events that had taken place a short time before in the context of the 1905 Russian Revolution and which would be the subject twenty years later of Sergei Eisenstein's celebrated film, Battleship Potemkin.

== Plot ==
On board the Russian battleship Potemkin, the crew complains about the poor quality of the food. Following a brief altercation, a sailor, Grigory Vakulinchuk, is killed by the commanding officer. Mutiny breaks out and officers are thrown overboard but one of the latter manages to impose himself and brings calm to the ship. Later, on the quays of Odessa, the body of the dead sailor is displayed and the inhabitants of the city come to pay their respects. A government ship then guns the city on the orders of an officer who, from the deck of the ship, observes the events. First he sees the city on fire and then, through his monocular, a family fleeing their burning home and a group of people being chased and manhandled by soldiers.

== Production ==
The film was announced in the July 1905 supplement of the Pathé catalogue, in the series Scènes historiques, politiques et d'actualité (Historical, political and current affairs scenes), only a few weeks after the Potemkin mutiny which took place on 27 June. With the exception of the opening shot which shows a battleship entering a harbour, the film was shot in at the new studio of Pathé in Montreuil-sous-Bois, where the installations included notably a pool with running water, which was used in the last scene.

== Analysis ==
The film is composed of four scenes:

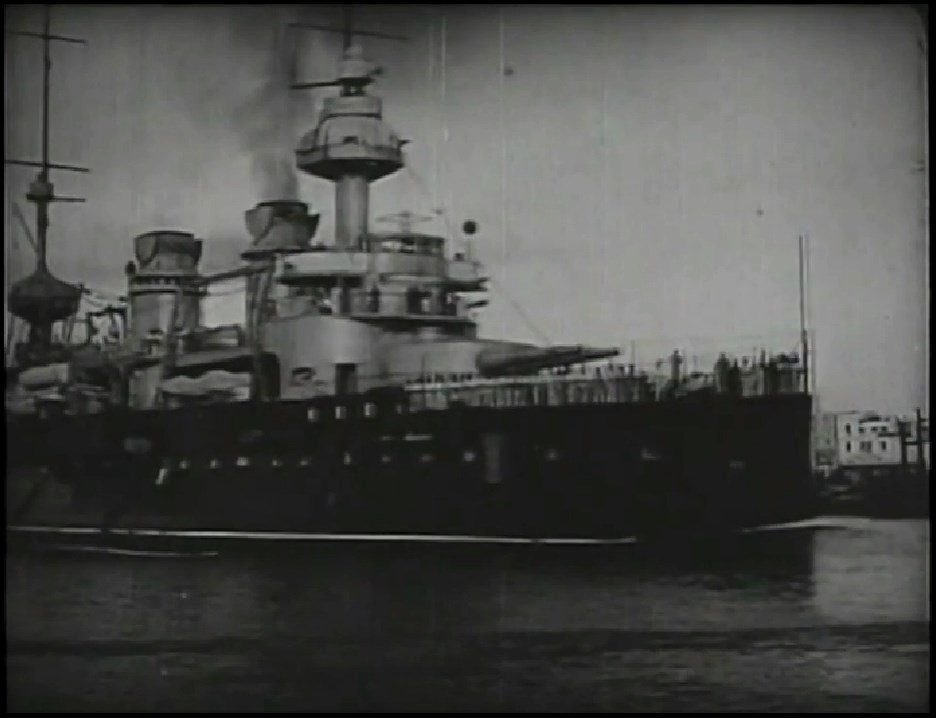
The opening shot

1. One shot of a battleship entering a harbour, probably an archive shot.

2. One fixed camera wide shot of a set figuring the deck and bridge of a ship where the mutiny takes place.

3. One wide shot of a set showing the ship at the quay in Odessa. Vakulinchuk's body is displayed on the quay and a crowd comes to pay their respects.

4. One shot showing at the foreground the deck of a ship with an officer seen from behind and in the background, beyond a pool of water, a panorama of Odessa. As the officer orders the gunning of the city, columns of smoke are rising in various places. This shot is interrupted twice by shots showing what the officer sees in his spyglass, a family leaving its burning house, and a column of soldiers attacking a crowd of men and women.
