= William Tell (1903 film) =

1903 French silent short film

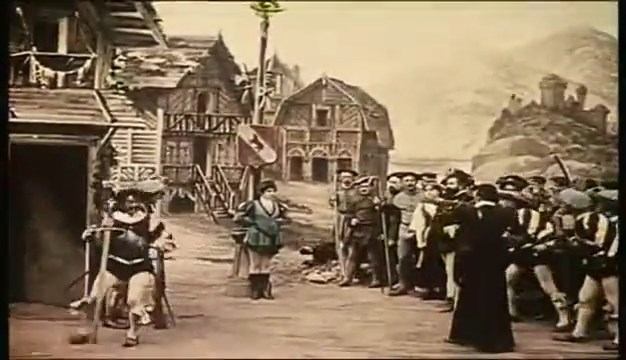
- French: Guillaume Tell
- Directed by: Lucien Nonguet
- Cinematography: Lucien Nonguet
- Production company: Pathé Frères
- Distributed by: Pathé Company
- Release date: 1903
- Running time: Approximately 5 minutes
- Country: France

William Tell is a 1903 French silent short film directed by Lucien Nonguet and distributed in France by Pathé Frères. The original French title is Guillaume Tell. It is the first film adaptation of the eponymous play by Friedrich Schiller.

== Cast ==
Edmond Boutillon as Albrecht Gessler

== Plot ==
William Tell (1903)

The film shows five scenes inspired by key moments of the eponymous play by Friedrich Schiller. Three of these scenes are introduced by an intertitle.

1. William Tell's heroism.

A mountainous landscape with a staircase. William Tell helps a peasant escape on a rowing boat just before a group of soldiers enters.

2. The Plot.

Intertitle: "People and bourgeois take oath"

A clearing near a mountain lake. A group of people enter and surround William Tell. They take a solemn oath.

3. The Apple.

Intertitle: "William Tell is arrested".

A village square in the mountains. Several villagers enter the square followed by two heralds who sound their trumpets before a proclamation is read: Everybody must salute the hat of Governor Gessler hanging on a pole. Everybody does it except William Tell who has just entered with his son. As punishment, he must shoot with his bow an arrow on an apple placed on his son's head. He achieves the feit but is nevertheless arrested.

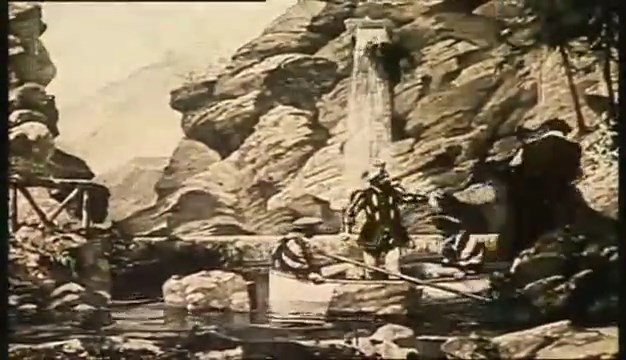
William Tell shoots Gessler

4. Death of Gessler.

Intertitle: "The people cheer William Tell".

An embankment in a mountainous landscape. Gessler arrives on a rowboat and William Tell shoots an arrow which kills him

5. The Swiss cheer their Liberator.

Villagers are dancing on a square. William Tell appears and all cheer him.

== Analysis ==
Although Georges Méliès directed in 1898 a film titled Adventures of William Tell (French: Guillaume Tell et le clown), this was just a knockabout farce featuring a clown trying to shoot an apple off the head of a dummy which comes to life. Lucien Nonguet can therefore rightly be credited as director of the first cinematographic adaptation of Schiller's play, albeit in a very abbreviated form. This was not the first historical film directed by Nonguet. He had already directed, also in 1903, one of Pathé's first historical film, Épopée napoléonienne, also known as The Life of Napoleon, Napoleon Bonaparte or The Rise and Fall of Napoleon the Great in the United States.

The film is shot in a tableau style, and follows the "single, unified viewpoint of the autonomous shot-scene", which had been established as a characteristic feature of the historical film genre by Épopée napoléonienne. Pathé actually stressed the theatrical esthetics of the film in the way it was presented in its catalogue: "This popular and interesting legend takes place amidst the country life of the mountain population. The beautiful and picturesque sights which exist in Switzerland have given us an opportunity of utilizing the resources our theatre affords and our scene-painters have been able to have a free run on their imaginations and have completed the work by a series of magnificent scenes of the most artistic character."

Some copies of the film were colorized with the mechanical stencil-based film tinting process Pathécolor in the workshop of Segundo de Chomón in Barcelona.

== Distribution ==
William Tell was distributed by Pathé Frères in 1903 in France, and in 1904 in the United States. In the latter country, it was also distributed by the Kleine Optical Company, the Edison Manufacturing Company, and the Lubin Manufacturing Company.
