= Christ Walking on the Water =

- Directed by: Georges Méliès
- Based on: New Testament, Mark 6:45-52
- Production company: Star Film Company
- Release date: 1899
- Running time: 20 meters
- Country: France
- Language: Silent

Christ Walking on the Water (French: Le Christ marchant sur les flots) is an 1899 French silent trick film directed by Georges Méliès.

== Production ==
In the summer of 1899, Georges Méliès and his family took a vacation on the coast of Normandy. During the vacation, Méliès made three short actuality films: Bird's-Eye View of St. Helier (Jersey), Steamer Entering the Harbor of Jersey, and Passengers Landing at Harbor of Granville. He also filmed the open sea, to use as a backdrop for multiple exposure effects for two fiction films: Neptune and Amphitrite and Christ Walking on the Water.

Christ Walking on the Water was based on the story told in Mark 6:45-52. The film was Méliès's second film based on religious themes; the first was The Temptation of Saint Anthony, made the previous year.

== Themes ==
The film depicted Christ in a simple storytelling fashion, emphasizing his magician-like qualities and the dramatic effect of the superhuman miracle. Méliès was not the only early filmmaker to favor this uncomplicated Christology; the religious films of the Lumière brothers use a similarly straightforward approach.

== Release and reception ==
The film was released by Méliès's Star Film Company and is numbered 204 in its catalogues, where it was advertised with the parenthetical subtitle exécuté sur mer véritable. It may have influenced Ferdinand Zecca's 1907 film La Vie et Passion de Notre Seigneur Jésus-Christ, which features a similar scene of Christ walking on water.

Christ Walking on the Water is currently presumed lost.
