= A Miracle Under the Inquisition =

- Directed by: Georges Méliès
- Starring: Georges Méliès; Mlle. Bodson
- Production company: Star Film Company
- Release date: 1904
- Country: France
- Language: Silent

Un miracle sous l'inquisition, sold in the United States as A Miracle Under the Inquisition and in Britain as A Miracle of the Inquisition, is a 1904 French silent trick film by Georges Méliès. It was sold by Méliès's Star Film Company and is numbered 558–559 in its catalogues.

Méliès appears in the film as the executioner, with a Mademoiselle Bodson as the accused woman. Her distinctive dress, with its four large squares embroidered with animal figures, was reused for Méliès's later films The Witch and The Good Shepherdess and the Evil Princess. The special effects of the miracle are carried out with pyrotechnics, substitution splices, and dissolves.
