= Germinal (novel) =

1885 novel by Émile Zola

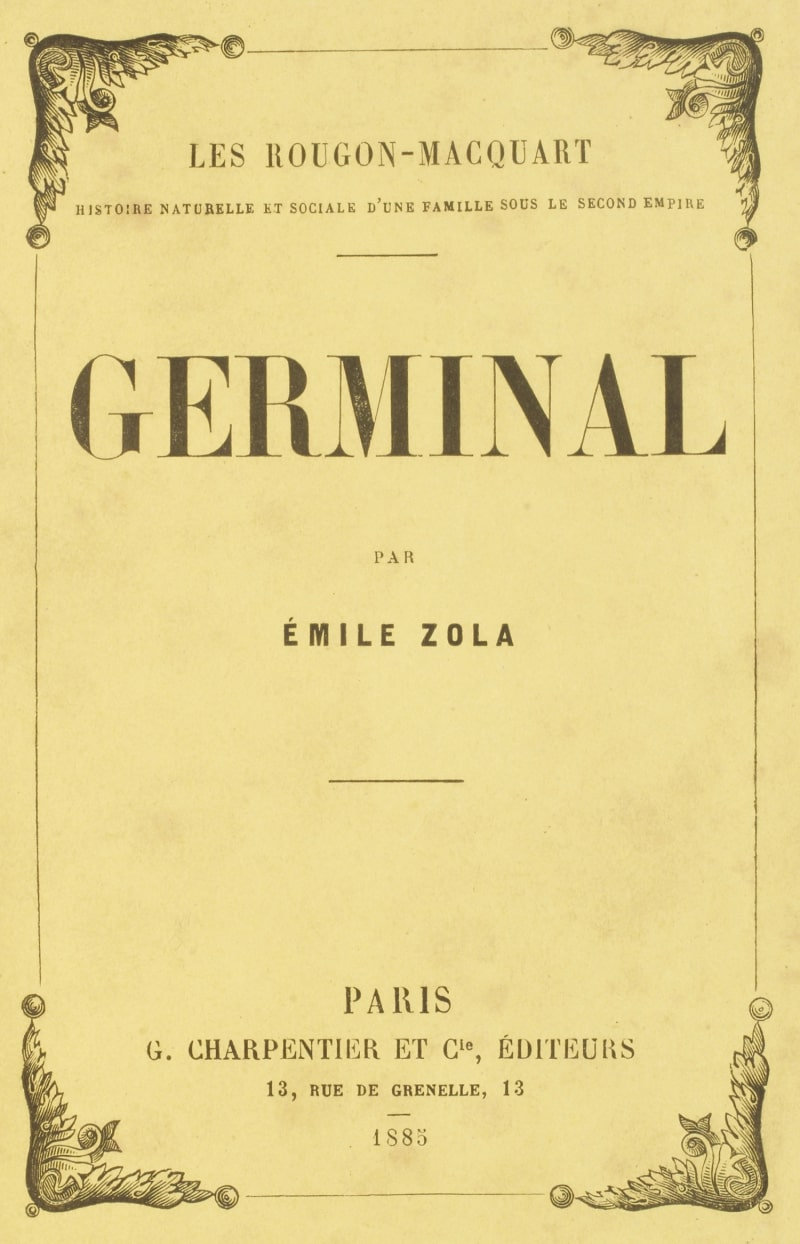
- First edition, 1885
- Author: Émile Zola
- Translator: Havelock Ellis (1894), Peter Collier (1993), Roger Pearson (2004), Raymond N. MacKenzie (2011)
- Language: French
- Series: Les Rougon-Macquart
- Genre: Novel
- Publisher: G. Charpentier
- Publication date: 1885
- Publication place: France
- English publication date: 1894
- Media type: Print (hardback and paperback)
- Pages: 592 (paperback)
- Dewey Decimal: 843.8
- Preceded by: The Beast Within
- Followed by: Nana

Germinal, by Émile Zola, in French. Part I - Chapter 1. LibriVox recording by Françoise.

Germinal is the thirteenth novel in Émile Zola's twenty-volume series Les Rougon-Macquart. Often considered Zola's masterpiece and one of the most significant novels in the French tradition, the novel – an uncompromisingly harsh and realistic story of a coalminers' strike in northern France in the 1860s – has been published and translated in over one hundred countries. It has also inspired five film adaptations and two television productions.

Germinal was written between April 1884 and January 1885. It was first serialized between November 1884 and February 1885 in the periodical Gil Blas, then in March 1885 published as a book.

The title (pronounced [ʒɛʁminal]) refers to the name of a month of the French Republican Calendar, a spring month. Germen is a Latin word which means "seed"; the novel describes the hope for a better future that seeds amongst the miners. As the final lines of the novel read:

Des hommes poussaient, une armée noire, vengeresse, qui germait lentement dans les sillons, grandissant pour les récoltes du siècle futur, et dont la germination allait faire bientôt éclater la terre.
Men were springing forth, a black avenging army, germinating slowly in the furrows, growing towards the harvests of the next century, and their germination would soon overturn the earth.

— 1885 translation

== Plot summary ==
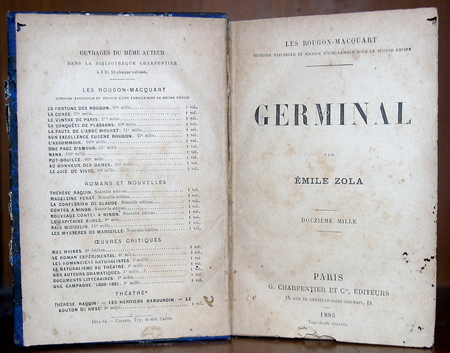
The title page of the 1885 French edition

The novel's central character is Étienne Lantier, previously seen in L'Assommoir (1877), and originally to have been the central character in Zola's "murder on the trains" thriller La Bête humaine (1890) before the overwhelmingly positive reaction to Germinal persuaded him otherwise. The young migrant worker arrives at the forbidding coal mining town of Montsou in the bleak area of the far north of France to earn a living as a miner. Sacked from his previous job on the railways for assaulting a superior, Étienne befriends the veteran miner Maheu, who finds him somewhere to stay and gets him a job pushing the carts down the pit.

Étienne is portrayed as a hard-working idealist but also a naïve youth; Zola's genetic theories come into play as Étienne is presumed to have inherited his Macquart ancestors' traits of hotheaded impulsiveness and an addictive personality capable of exploding into rage under the influence of drink or strong passions. He embraces socialist principles, reading large amounts of working class movement literature and fraternizing with Souvarine, a Russian anarchist and political émigré who has also come to Montsou to seek a living in the pits, and Rasseneur, a pub owner.

While this is going on, Étienne also falls for Maheu's daughter Catherine, also employed pushing carts in the mines, and he is drawn into the relationship between her and her brutish lover Chaval. The complex tangle of the miners' lives is played out against a backdrop of severe poverty and oppression, as their working and living conditions continue to worsen throughout the novel; eventually, pushed to breaking point, the miners decide to strike and Étienne, now a respected member of the community and recognized as a political idealist, becomes the leader of the movement. While the anarchist Souvarine preaches violent action, the miners and their families hold back, their poverty becoming ever more disastrous, until they are sparked into a ferocious, violent riot. The rioters are eventually confronted by police and the army, who repress the revolt. Disillusioned, the miners go back to work, blaming Étienne for the failure of the strike; then, Souvarine sabotages the entrance shaft of one of the Montsou pits, trapping Étienne, Catherine and Chaval at the bottom. The ensuing drama and the long wait for rescue are among some of Zola's best scenes, and the novel draws to a dramatic close. After Chaval is killed by Étienne, Catherine and Étienne are finally able to be lovers before Catherine dies in his arms. Étienne is eventually rescued and fired but he goes on to live in Paris with Pluchart, an organizer for the International.

== Historical context ==
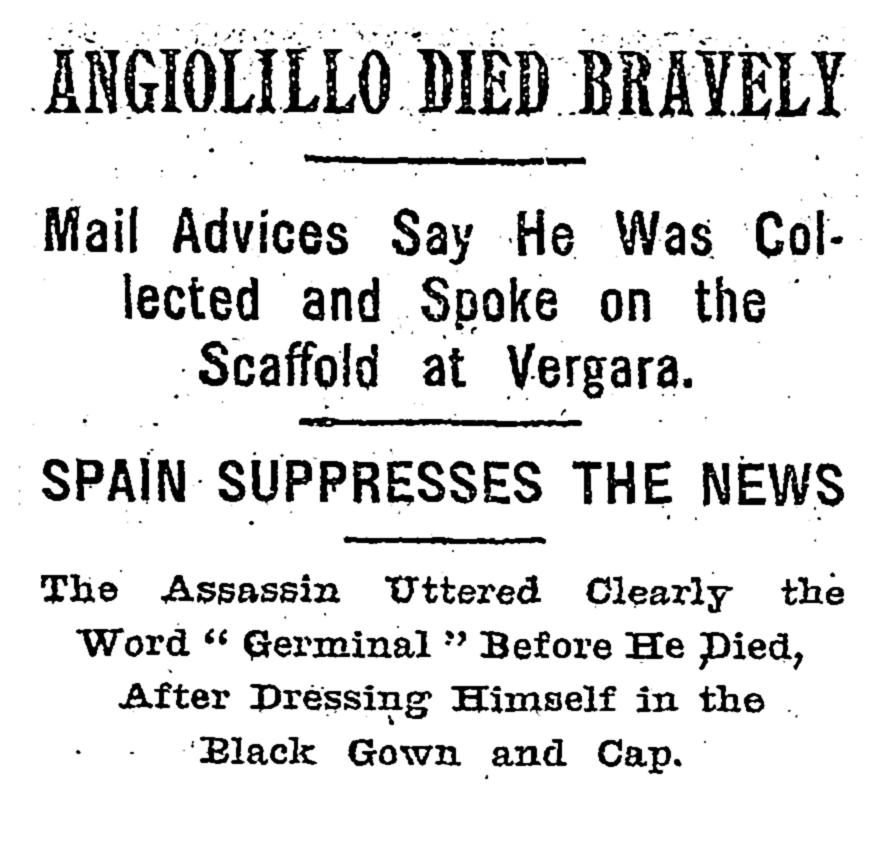
Michele Angiolillo uttered the word "Germinal" before he died.

The title, Germinal, is drawn from the springtime seventh month of the French Revolutionary Calendar and is meant to evoke imagery of germination, new growth and fertility. Accordingly, Zola ends the novel on a note of hope and one that has provided inspiration to socialist and reformist causes of all kinds throughout the years since its first publication:

Beneath the blazing of the sun, in that morning of new growth, the countryside rang with song, as its belly swelled with a black and avenging army of men, germinating slowly in its furrows, growing upwards in readiness for harvests to come, until one day soon their ripening would burst open the earth itself.

By the time of Zola's death, the novel had come to be recognized as his undisputed masterpiece. At his funeral crowds of workers gathered, cheering the cortège with shouts of "Germinal! Germinal!". Since then the book has come to symbolize working class causes and to this day retains a special place in French mining-town folklore.

Zola was always very proud of Germinal and was always keen to defend its accuracy against accusations of hyperbole and exaggeration (from the conservatives) or of slander against the working classes (from the socialists). His research had been typically thorough, especially the parts involving lengthy observational visits to northern French mining towns in 1884, such as witnessing the after-effects of a crippling miners' strike first-hand at Anzin or actually going down a working coal pit at Denain. The mine scenes are especially vivid and haunting as a result. Tom Wolfe described one incident from Zola's research:

In 1884 Zola went down into the mines at Anzin to do the documentation for what was to become the novel Germinal. Posing as a secretary for a member of the French Chamber of Deputies, he descended into the pits wearing his city clothes, his frock coat, high stiff collar, and high stiff hat (this appeals to me for reasons I won’t delay you with), and carrying a notebook and pen. One day Zola and the miners who were serving as his guides were 150 feet below the ground when Zola noticed an enormous workhorse, a Percheron, pulling a sled piled with coal through a tunnel. Zola asked, “How do you get that animal in and out of the mine every day?” At first the miners thought he was joking. Then they realized he was serious, and one of them said, “Mr. Zola, don’t you understand? That horse comes down here once, when he’s a colt, barely more than a foal, and still able to fit into the buckets that bring us down here. That horse grows up down here. He grows blind down here after a year or two, from the lack of light. He hauls coal down here until he can’t haul it anymore, and then he dies down here, and his bones are buried down here.” When Zola transfers this revelation from the pages of his documentation notebook to the pages of Germinal, it makes the hair on your arms stand on end. You realize, without the need of amplification, that the horse is the miners themselves, who descend below the face of the earth as children and dig coal down in the pit until they can dig no more and then are buried, often literally, down there.

By far the best-selling of Zola's novels, it was a sensation upon its original publication, both in France and internationally. A number of modern translations are currently in print and widely available.

== English translations ==
=== Expurgated ===
1. 1885: Carlynne Belford (Clarke & Co.)
2. 1886: Albert Vandam (Vizetelly & Co.)

=== Unexpurgated ===
1. 1894: Dr. Henry Havelock Ellis and Edith Ellis (Lutetian Society)
2. 1954: Leonard W. Tancock (Penguin Books)
3. 1962: Willard Ropes Trask (Bantam Books)
4. 1970: Stanley Hochman and Eleanor Hochman (New American Library)
5. 1993: Peter Collier (Oxford University Press)
6. 1996: Dr. Henry Havelock Ellis and Edith Ellis, revised by David Baguley (Everyman's Library)
7. 2004: Roger Pearson (Penguin Books)
8. 2011: Raymond N. MacKenzie (Hackett Publishing)

== Adaptations ==
The novel has been filmed a number of times, including:

- The Strike (1904), directed by Ferdinand Zecca.
- Au Pays Noir, (1905), directed by Ferdinand Zecca and Lucien Nonguet.
- Germinal (1913), directed by Albert Capellani, starring Henry Krauss
- Germinal (1963), directed by Yves Allégret, starring Jean Sorel, Berthe Granval, Claude Brasseur and Bernard Blier.
- Germinal (1970), a BBC five-part serial with Mark Jones and Rosemary Leach
- Germinal (1993), a large-scale production directed by Claude Berri and starring Gérard Depardieu and Miou-Miou, at that time the most expensive feature film ever made in France. Much of Berri's film was shot on location in the Lens and Valenciennes regions of northern France, and the extensive unemployment and poverty the cast and crew still witnessed there led to the formation of a society, "Germinal l'association", headed by Depardieu, to alleviate the suffering caused by crippling unemployment in the départements comprising the region of Nord-Pas-de-Calais.
- Germinal (2021), a six-episode series for France 2 directed by David Hourrègue, starring Luis Peres, Alix Poisson, and Guillaume de Tonquédec.

== Tributes ==
- Les Enfants de Germinal. (The children of Germinal). - text by Cavanna, images by Robert Doisneau. Hoëbeke Editions. Paris. 1993
- KFC Germinal Ekeren, a Belgian football club took its name after the novel.
- Disco Elysium, (2019) is a Role Playing Video Game featuring a dispute and unsolved murder between the stevedoring Labor movement and the private company who works with them. The creators, ZA/UM, have cited Germinal as a source of major inspiration. This game won the 2019 BAFTA game awards for best narrative, soundtrack, and debut game from a company.
