= The Strike (1904 film) =

1904 French silent short film

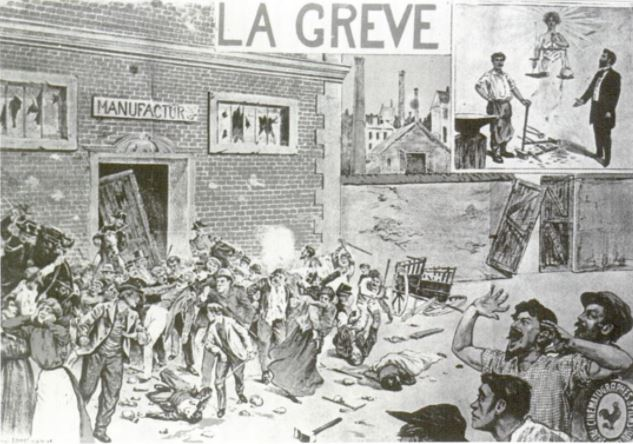
- Poster
- French: La Grève
- Directed by: Ferdinand Zecca
- Cinematography: Ferdinand Zecca
- Production company: Pathé Frères
- Distributed by: Pathé Company
- Release date: 1904
- Running time: 5 minutes
- Country: France

The Strike (French: La Grève) is a 1904 French silent short film directed by Ferdinand Zecca and distributed in France by Pathé Frères. The film depicts a strike in a factory violently repressed by the Gendarmerie.

== Plot ==
The Strike (1904)

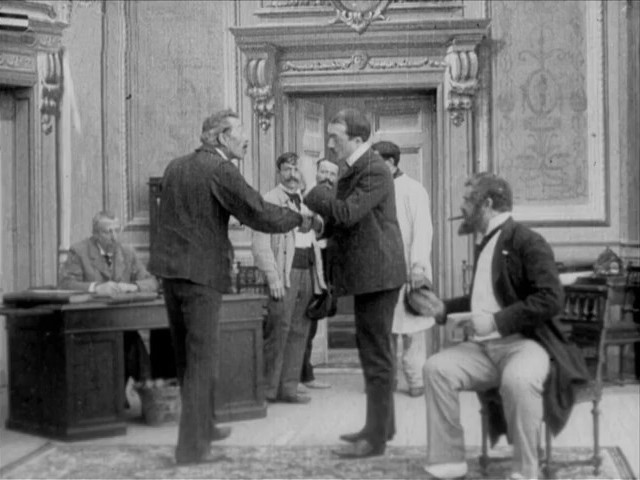
The Workers' representative shakes hand with the Director's son

The film is composed of five scenes introduced by title cards:

1. Refusal of arbitration. The scene is in the Director's office. The workers' delegation is introduced and submits the wishes of their comrades, but the manager, despite his son's intervention, refuses any compromise.
2. The Director's murderess. The factory is guarded militarily. The delegation goes out and announces the refusal of the Director. The workers, angry, try to invade the factory but an officer orders to fire. Several men and children are wounded or killed. The manager try to parley with the workers. A woman, who had just seen her husband killed before her eyes, grabs a brick and throws it at the head of the manager and kills him.
3. Arrest of the culprit. In a poor slum, the dead worker lies on the bed surrounded by his wife and children. Suddenly gendarmes enter the house and arrest the poor woman. She is taken away in spite of the cries and tears of her children.
4. Acquitted. The unfortunate woman pleads for her freedom and to be allowed to look after her children. The Director's son, knowing that his father was wrong, asks for the accused's freedom. The judges, due to the circumstances, acquit her.
5. The Future. An apotheosis shows Labour as a worker and Capital as a rich man determined to unite their efforts to give happiness and fortune to all in the future. Justice appears and presides over this loyal alliance.

== Distribution ==
The première of the film took place at the Grand Cinématographe Américain in Rouen on 29 September 1904. The film was further distributed by Pathé Frères in Spain under the title La Huelga, and in the United Kingdom and the United States under the title The Strike. In the latter country, it was also distributed by the Kleine Optical Company, the Edison Manufacturing Company, and the Lubin Manufacturing Company.

According to Richard Abel, The Strike was one of the few films shown in the United States at the time representing labor unrest. He notes that when it was screened in December 1904, in Boston, "the film was watched with deep interest, ending in applause". He also mentions that the film received good notices in the 1904 reports of the Keith movie theatre managers of Cleveland and New York.

== Analysis ==
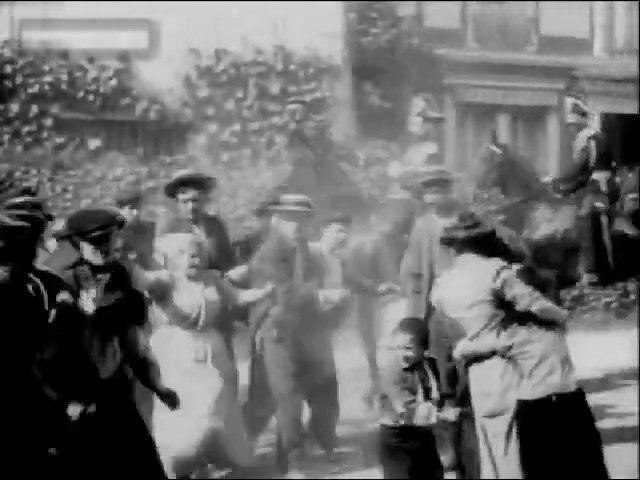
The Workers fleeing the charge of the Gendarmerie

This is the first film adapting some parts of Emile Zola's 1885 novel Germinal.

This is the first film quoted by M. Keith Booker to support his demonstration that early working-class film was central not only to the evolution of leftist culture but to the evolution of cinema itself and that early films dealt not only with capitalism, but also "with the concomitant attempts of the working class to resist the increasingly exploitative practices of the new system." He notices however that the film is "liberal rather radical" as it attributes the exploitation of workers "to bad management rather than to the capitalist system".

All scenes but scene 2 are composed of one single wide shot filmed by a static frontal camera. In scene 2, after an initial frontal view, the camera pans first to the right and then to the left to follow the workers rushing past it, placing the viewer at the centre of the action. Richard Abel mentions The Strike as an early example of a transformation of film discourse, where frame changes are used within a continuous flow of action, "not only to reconstruct a synthetic diegetic space for that action, but also to elicit, suspend and fulfill narrative expectation". He stresses in particular how it creates an unusually "deep space" playing area and how in scene 2 the camera pans to follow the crowd "perhaps in an attempt to reproduce the verisimilitude of an actualité".
