= Peter Malone =

Peter Malone may refer to:

- Peter Malone (critic) (born 1939), Australian film critic and Catholic priest
- Peter Malone (swimming coach), swimming coach from the United States
- Peter Malone (mayor) (1928–2006), mayor of Nelson, New Zealand, 1980–1992
- Gerry Malone (Peter Gerald Malone, born 1950), British politician
