= Lucien Nonguet =

French film director, actor and screenwriter

- Born: Lucien Henri Nonguet; 10 May 1869; Poitiers, France
- Died: 22 June 1955 (aged 86); Fay-aux-Loges, France
- Occupations: film director; actor; screenwriter

Lucien Henri Nonguet (10 May 1869 – 22 June 1955) was a French film director, actor and screenwriter. He was one of the first film directors and screenwriters of the Pathé company.

== Biography ==
Lucien Nonguet was born on 10 May 1869 in Poitiers, the son of dramatic artist Josué Nonguet (1831–1881). He was first an actor and director of extras at the theatre, among others at the Châtelet and l'Ambigu.

Nonguet was hired on at Pathé in 1901 as assistant to Ferdinand Zecca and director of figuration. This function, which in the theatre consisted of recruiting and directing actors for the needs of a play, was to become the forerunner of the director's job at the beginning of the cinema. Zecca and Nonguet began a series of important collaborations, starting in 1901 with Quo Vadis, based on the eponymous novel by Henryk Sienkiewicz. This was followed by the féérie, La Belle au bois dormant, in 1902. The best known of the Zecca/Nonguet collaborations is the 44 minutes silent film Vie et Passion du Christ, released in 1903.

Nonguet also directed alone a number of films at Pathé, specialising in historical reconstructions or reconstructed Actuality films, composed of a series of tableaux, filmed in long shots with no camera movement, and often based on photographs or paintings of the events depicted. Épopée Napoléonienne (1903), a two-part epic of the life of Napoleon seems to have been the model upon which Pathé's later histories and actualities were based. Other historical films directed by Nonguet include La Révolution en Russie (1905) and La Saint Barthelemy (1905).

In 1920, Lucien Nonguet left the Pathé company to become director of the Alhambra-Saint-Ouen cinema.

He died on 22 June 1955 in Fay-aux-Loges, a village in the Loiret, about 120 kilometres (75 mi) southwest of Paris.

== Selected filmography ==
- 1902 : Quo Vadis
- 1902 : La Belle au bois dormant
- 1903: Massacres de Macédonie
- 1903: Assassinat de la famille royale de Serbie
- 1903: Le Pape Léon XIII au Vatican
- 1903: La Mort du pape Léon XIII
- 1903: Épopée napoléonienne – Napoléon Bonaparte
- 1903: Épopée napoléonienne – L'Empire / L'Empire, grandeur et décadence
- 1903: Guillaume Tell
- 1903: Don Quichotte
- 1903: Le Chat botté
- 1903: Vie et Passion du Christ
- 1904: Évènements russo-japonais (several short films)
- 1904: L'Assassinat du ministre russe de l'Intérieur Viatcheslav Plehve
- 1904: L'Incendie du théâtre Iroquois à Chicago
- 1905: Vie et passion de notre seigneur Jésus-Christ
- 1905: Les Troubles de Saint-Pétersbourg
- 1905: La Saint-Barthélémy
- 1905: La Révolution en Russie
- 1905: Au Pays Noir, d'après Germinal by Émile Zola
- 1905: Atrocités antisémites russes
- 1905: L'Assassinat du grand-duc Serge
- 1905: L'Incendiaire
- 1905: Les Petits vagabonds
- 1905: Dix femmes pour un mari
- 1905: Les Martyrs de l'Inquisition
- 1906: Pour la fête de sa mère
- 1906: Terrible angoisse
- 1906: Les Dessous de Paris
- 1907: Idée d'apache
- 1907: À Biribi, disciplinaires français
- 1907: Une mauvaise vie
- 1907: La Vie de Polichinelle
- 1908: Victime de sa probité
- 1908: Le Bébé
- 1908: La Belle au bois dormant
- 1908: Le Roman d'un malheureux
- 1908: L'Affaire Dreyfus, co-directed with Ferdinand Zecca.
- 1910: Max prend un bain
- 1919: Les Trois potards
- 1919: Frédy chef costumier
- 1919: Les Deux paillassons
- 1920: Une institution modèle
- 1907 to 1914: Several films in the series Max, starring Max Linder.
- 1905 to 1913: Several films in the series Gontran, starring René Gréhan.
