= The Good Shepherdess and the Evil Princess =

- Directed by: Georges Méliès or Manuel
- Produced by: Georges Méliès
- Production company: Star Film Company
- Release date: 1908
- Country: France
- Language: Silent

The Good Shepherdess and the Evil Princess (French: La Bonne Bergère et la Mauvaise Princesse) is a 1908 French short silent film credited to Georges Méliès. It was sold by Méliès's Star Film Company and is numbered 1429–1441 in its catalogues.

A Centre national de la cinématographie guide to Méliès's films, analyzing the film's style, concludes that it was probably directed not by Méliès but by an employee of his, an actor-director known as Manuel. Special effects in the film are worked by stage machinery, pyrotechnics, substitution splices, and dissolves. The film was shot partly in one of Méliès's glass studios in Montreuil-sous-Bois, and partly outdoors, in the garden of Méliès's family property next to the studios.

Only an incomplete print of the film is known to exist; the rest is presumed lost.
