= The Human Fly (film) =

1902 film by Georges Méliès

- Directed by: Georges Méliès
- Production company: Star Film Company
- Release date: 1902
- Country: France
- Language: Silent

A hand-coloured print of the film

The Human Fly (French: L'Homme-Mouche) is a 1902 French silent trick film by Georges Méliès. It was sold by Méliès's Star Film Company and is numbered 415–416 in its catalogues.

Méliès himself plays the Russian dancer. This film is probably the first time Méliès used a vertical vantage point, pointing his camera directly toward the floor; two other technical effects, the substitution splice and the multiple exposure, completed the illusion.
