= Vie et Passion du Christ =

- Vie et Passion du Christ (1903)
- Directed by: Lucien Nonguet (co-director), Ferdinand Zecca (co-director)
- Produced by: Charles Pathé
- Starring: Madame Moreau (Virgin Mary); Monsieur Moreau (Joseph)
- Cinematography: Camille Legrand; Wormser
- Distributed by: Pathé Frères
- Release dates: May 1903 (France); June 1903 (U.S.)
- Running time: 44 minutes
- Country: France
- Language: Silent (French intertitles)

Vie et Passion du Christ (English: Life and Passion of the Christ) is a 44-minute French silent film that was produced and released in 1903. As such, it is considered the first feature-length narrative film.

The film, with sequences made in the stencil color process Pathéchrome, takes a straightforward approach to its subject matter. All scenes are introduced by an inter-title giving the traditional name of the event (the Annunciation, the Nativity, etc.) followed by the actors playing out the familiar stories from the Gospels. Other than the scene titles, there are no other inter-titles. Many of the scenes attempt to recreate the illustrations of the life of Christ by Gustave Doré in detail.

In 1932, the film was re-issued in the U.S., distributed on a states-rights basis. Instead of the stencil coloring effect, however, the film was printed on red-tinted stock, with a musical score compiled by James C. Bradford.

== Multiple Pathé Passion Play films ==
The original French title for the film was La Vie et la passion de Jésus Christ (The Life and the Passion of Jesus Christ). At least ten different Passion Play films were released between 1897 and 1914, including three by Pathé in 1902, 1907, and 1914. The 1902 version was expanded and revised several times by Pathé before an all-new remake was released in 1907.

The Annunciation scene from the 1902-1905 film	The Annunciation scene from the 1907 film

== Legacy ==
The film was included by the Vatican in a list of important films compiled in 1995, under the category of "Religion". It is the oldest entry to make the list.

== See also ==
- List of films based on the Bible
- List of early color feature films
