= Adventures of William Tell =

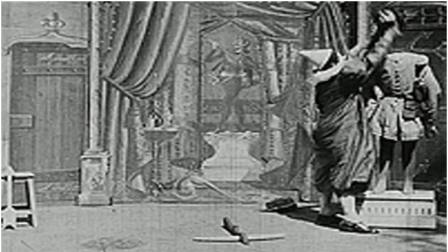
- Screenshot from the film
- Directed by: Georges Méliès
- Release date: 1898
- Country: France
- Language: Silent

Adventures of William Tell (French: Guillaume Tell et le clown) is an 1898 French silent trick film directed by Georges Méliès, featuring a clown trying to shoot fruit off the head of a dummy which comes to life.

The film is "a knockabout farce based on jump-cuts and the timely substitution of dummies for real bodies", with, according to Michael Brooke of BFI Screenonline, "a level of onscreen violence not previously seen in a surviving Méliès film", which marks "a bridge between the onstage effects of the famous Théâtre du Grand Guignol and countless later outpourings of comically extreme screen violence as seen in everything from Tex Avery cartoons to the early films of Sam Raimi".

Adventures of William Tell was released by Méliès's Star Film Company and is numbered 159 in its catalogues, where it is advertised as a scène comico-fantastique.

== Synopsis ==
A surviving print of the film

A clown constructs a mannequin of William Tell atop a pedestal and places a piece of fruit on its head, with the intent of shooting it with his crossbow for practice. The mannequin then comes to life as a living William Tell, and hurls the fruit at the clown before he can take aim with his crossbow. The clown removes and replaces first the mannequin's arm and then its head, at which point it comes to life again, tramples the clown and makes its escape, with the now irate clown in pursuit.

== Current status ==
Given its age, this short film is available to freely download from the Internet, at IMDB.
