= The Chimney Sweep =

The Chimney Sweep may refer to:

- The Chimney Sweep (painting), an 1866 painting by Frederick Daniel Hardy
- The Chimney Sweep (film), a 1906 French silent film directed by Georges Méliès
- "The Shepherdess and the Chimney Sweep", a literary fairy tale by Hans Christian Andersen
- Springman and the SS, also known as "The Chimney Sweep", a 1946 Czechoslovak film directed by Jiří Brdečka and Jiří Trnka
- Der Rauchfangkehrer (The Chimney Sweep), 1781 opera by Antonio Salieri

== See also ==
- "The Chimney Sweeper", a poem by William Blake
- The King and the Mockingbird (Le Roi et l'Oiseau), a 1952 French animated film based on the Hans Christian Andersen story
