= The Providence of the Waves =

- Directed by: Georges Méliès
- Production company: Star Film Company
- Release date: 1904
- Country: France
- Language: Silent

La Providence de Notre-Dame-des-Flots, sold in the United States as The Providence of the Waves, or the Dream of a Poor Fisherman and in Britain as The Fisher's Guardian Angel, is a 1904 silent film directed by Georges Méliès.

== Plot ==
An impoverished fisherman, not earning enough to support his wife and daughter, prays for help before an icon of the Virgin Mary. He falls asleep and dreams of the goddess Fortuna standing on her wheel, pouring gold for him out of a horn of plenty. On waking, the memory of the dream drives him to despair. He is about to commit suicide with a revolver, but is stopped just in time by his wife, who rebukes him for being ready to leave his family unprotected and alone.

Just then a philanthropic nobleman and his daughter, traveling the countryside on errands of charity, stop at the fisherman's cabin and discover his family's plight. The noble duo shower the poor family with gifts. As they are at the door and about to leave, the nobleman's daughter momentarily takes the appearance of the icon of Mary. The fisherman, amazed that his prayer has been answered, kneels in thanksgiving.

== Production and release ==
The film is one of Méliès's few forays into realism; his other films in the style include The Christmas Angel and A Desperate Crime, and there are also similarities to his actuality films and reconstructed newsreels. The American catalogue description for The Providence of the Waves notes: "Here we are in the presence of a moral and sentimental subject adapted for all audiences. The playing of the actors, while sober, is absolutely perfect—one would think that reality itself unrolls before the eyes."

The film is also a notable early example of an often-used cinematic narrative device in which a miraculous intervention is linked to a symbol of the Virgin Mary, casting her as an indirect deus ex machina. Méliès's scenario was adapted and directed as a new short film in 1988 by Gérard Krawczyk, as part of the TF1 television program Méliès 88, featuring eight modern film directors' responses to lost films by Méliès.

The Providence of the Waves was released by Méliès's Star Film Company and is numbered 598–602 in its catalogues. The film is currently presumed lost.
