= The Dream of an Opium Fiend =

1908 French film

- Directed by: Georges Méliès or Manuel
- Starring: Georges Méliès; Mlle. Bodson
- Production company: Star Film Company
- Release date: 1908
- Country: France
- Language: Silent

The Dream of an Opium Fiend (French: Le Rêve d'un fumeur d'opium) is a 1908 French silent trick film credited to and featuring Georges Méliès. It was sold by Méliès's Star Film Company and is numbered 1081–1085 in its catalogues.

== Plot ==
In an opium den, an attendant offers a well-dressed gentleman a pipe of opium. The gentleman dreams he is at home, and that his wife and maidservant are pouring him a large glass of beer. However, before he can drink it, the beer flies upward through the window to Phoebe, the Moon goddess, seated on her crescent in the sky. The dream shifts to imagine the Man in the Moon flying through the sky, to meet the beer glass as it travels through space.

The dream shifts back to the gentleman's dining room, where he attempts to have a drink with Phoebe and to flirt with her. However, first the beer glass, then Phoebe herself, magically jump around the room, evading the gentleman's attempts at control. Just as the gentleman thinks he has chased Phoebe into his arms, she turns into a grotesque clown. The clown teases the frantic gentleman as the dream comes to an abrupt end.

== Production ==
Méliès plays the Chinese opium den attendant in the film, and a Mademoiselle Bodson plays the maidservant. An analysis in a Centre national de la cinématographie (CNC) guide to Méliès's films concludes that the film was probably supervised by a colleague of Méliès, an actor known as Manuel. Nonetheless, it features both Méliès and several motifs common in Méliès's earlier films; for example, here as elsewhere in Méliès's filmography, the Moon is personified both as a beautiful woman and a grimacing head. Special effects in the film were created with stage machinery, rolling scenery, substitution splices, multiple exposures, and dissolves.

The CNC analysis notes that although this title suggests Dream of a Rarebit Fiend, a 1906 American trick film by Edwin S. Porter, the plots are completely different. Porter's film, on the other hand, strongly implies a Méliès influence, particularly recalling The Bewitched Inn (1897) and The Inn Where No Man Rests (1903).

A print of the film survives, though a section may be missing from the end.
