= Under the Seas =

Deux Cents Mille Lieues sous les mers ou le Cauchemar du pêcheur
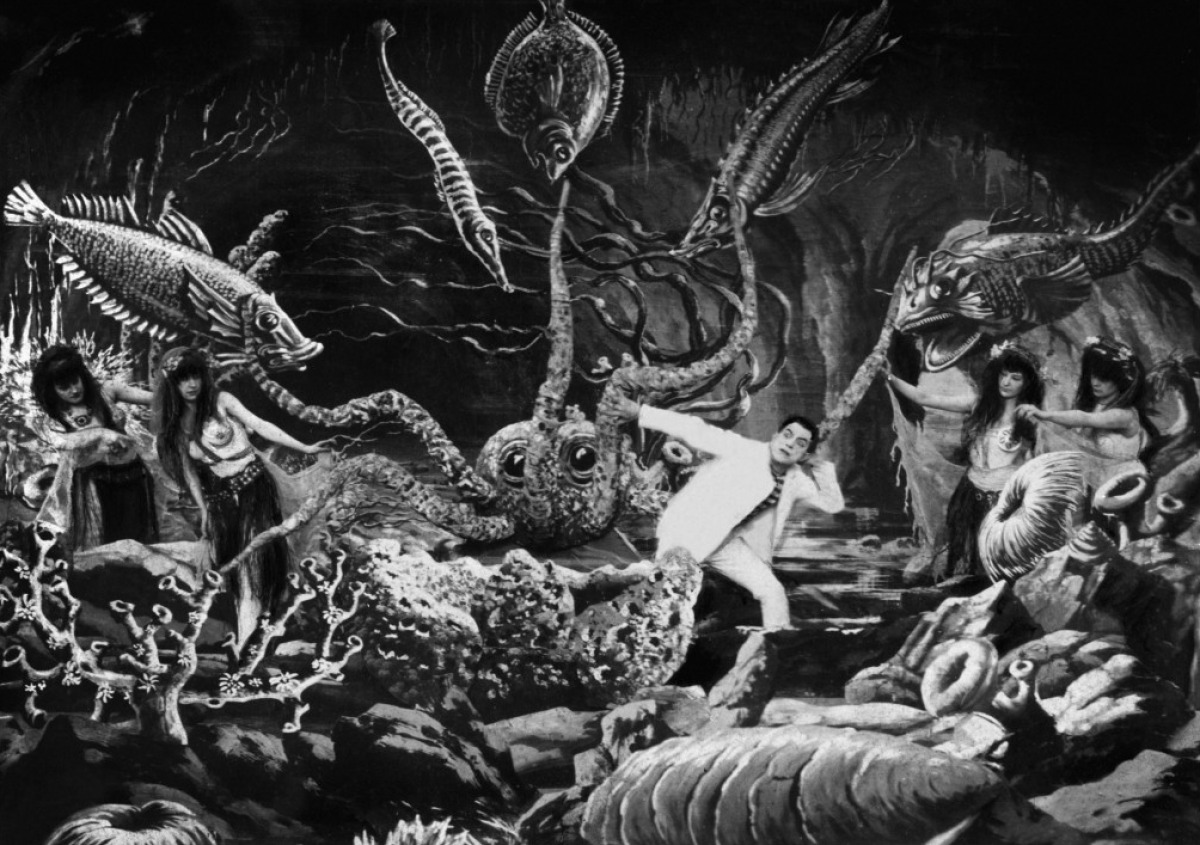
- A scene from near the end of the film
- Directed by: Georges Méliès
- Based on: Twenty Thousand Leagues Under the Seas by Jules Verne
- Release date: 1907
- Running time: 286 meters/930 feet 14 minutes
- Country: France
- Language: Silent

Under the Seas (1907) by Georges Méliès

Under the Seas (French: Deux Cents Mille Lieues sous les mers ou le Cauchemar du pêcheur) (Note: These are the original English and French titles, respectively, as listed in the earliest available Méliès catalogues. The film is also known as Deux cent mille lieues sous les mers ou le cauchemar d'un pêcheur and as 20,000 Leagues Under the Sea.) is a short silent film made in 1907 by the French director Georges Méliès. The film, a parody of the 1870 novel Twenty Thousand Leagues Under the Seas by Jules Verne, follows a fisherman who dreams of traveling by submarine to the bottom of the ocean, where he encounters both realistic and fanciful sea creatures, including a chorus of naiads.

== Plot ==
Yves, (Note: The fisherman's name is Yves in Méliès's French synopsis of the film. For the English-language synopsis in Méliès's American catalogues, the name was spelled Ives.) a fisherman, comes home after a tiring day of fishing and soon falls asleep. The Fairy of the Ocean appears to him in his dream and directs him to a submarine. After being promoted to Lieutenant-in-Command, Yves departs on a submarine expedition.

A panorama of undersea views follows, including shipwrecks, underwater grottoes, huge shellfish, Nereids (sea nymphs), sea monsters, starfish, mermaids, and a ballet of naiads. The ballet is interrupted by Yves, whose inexperience with submarines leads him to run his craft aground on a rock. Yves leaves the wrecked submarine and chases after the departing naiads, but is attacked by huge fish and crabs. He escapes and travels past further underwater marvels, including underwater caves, anemones, corals, giant seahorses, and an octopus that attacks him. However, in vengeance for all the fish Yves has caught in his career, the goddesses of the sea trap the fisherman in a net and let him fall into a gigantic hollow sponge, from which he struggles to escape.

Waking up from the dream, Yves realizes that he has fallen from his bed into his bathtub, and is entangled in his own fishing net. His neighbors and friends free him from the confusion, and he treats them all to drinks at the nearest café. (Note: Since only a fragment of the film survives, this plot summary is based on the synopsis offered in Méliès's American catalogue.)

== Production and release ==
The actor Manuel, who had appeared in Méliès's 1906 drama A Desperate Crime and who would go on to direct some films for Méliès's studio in 1908, plays Yves the fisherman; the chorus of naiads is played by dancers from the Théâtre du Châtelet. The ballet in the film was choreographed by Madame Stitchel, the director of the Châtelet corps de ballet; Stitchel also choreographed dances for other Méliès films, including The Chimney Sweep. Méliès's design for the film includes cut-out sea animals patterned after Alphonse de Neuville's illustrations for Verne's novel.

It was released by Méliès's Star Film Company and is numbered 912–924 in its catalogues, where it was advertised as a grande féerie fantaisiste en 30 tableaux. Like at least 4% of Méliès's entire output, some prints of the film were hand-tinted frame by frame by female factory workers and sold at a higher price.

The film survives as an incomplete fragment; some scenes are presumed lost.

== See also ==
- 1907 in science fiction
- List of underwater science fiction works
