= Augustus Edwin Mulready =

English painter (1844–1904)

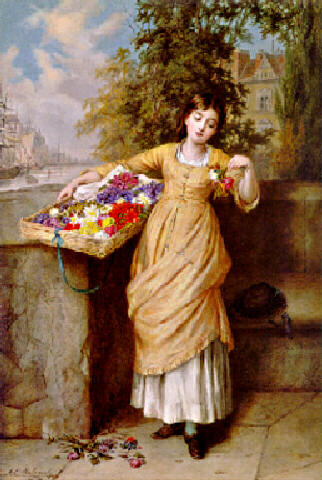
Fading flowers 1882

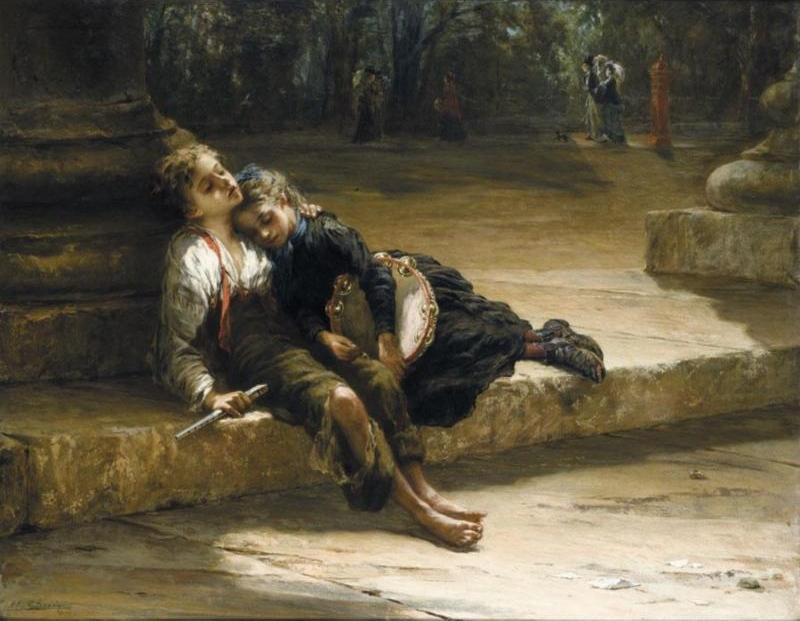
Wandering Minstrels 1876

Augustus Edwin Mulready (23 February 1844 – 15 March 1904)) was an English genre painter. He often depicted London street scenes with urchins and flower-sellers.

== Life and work ==
Mulready came from a family of artists. His grandfather, William Mulready (1786–1863), came to London from Ireland and established himself as a very successful and popular genre painter and book illustrator. His grandmother Elizabeth Mulready, née Varley (1784–1864) was a landscape painter, and the sister of artist John Varley (1778–1842).

Mulready was born in Kensal Green, London, the third of five children of William Mulready Junior (1805–1878, portrait painter and picture restorer), and his wife Sara (1818–1874). He studied art at the South Kensington Schools and as early as 1861, at the age of 17, was already promoting himself as a figure artist. In the same year he entered the Royal Academy, London on the recommendation of John Callcott Horsley who took him under his patronage. In 1903, reflecting on Horsley's death, Mulready wrote that Horsley was "for so many years...regarded by myself as more than a father or valued friend I have known - whose many acts, by word of help and of kindness, throughout the days of his life to me have been so marked and fixed in love though now in tears of memory".

Mulready's artistic career was much overshadowed by the fame of his grandfather, William Mulready, who was remembered, praised, exhibited and referred to long after his death in 1863. He exhibited, however, at the Royal Academy between 1863 and 1880, at the Hanover Gallery, and the art galleries of Liverpool and Southport, and his paintings were sold at Christie's. In 1879, 'A Naturalist's Window' shown at Walker Art Gallery in Liverpool was praised by a local critic as representing "a group of persons in various stations of lfe, including an African nurse girl, looking at a stuffed gorilla in a naturalist shop. It is a remarkable production and does great credit to Mr A E Mulready.". His artistic manner - figurative painting with extensive use of colours and attention to detail - was similar to that of his father and grandfather.

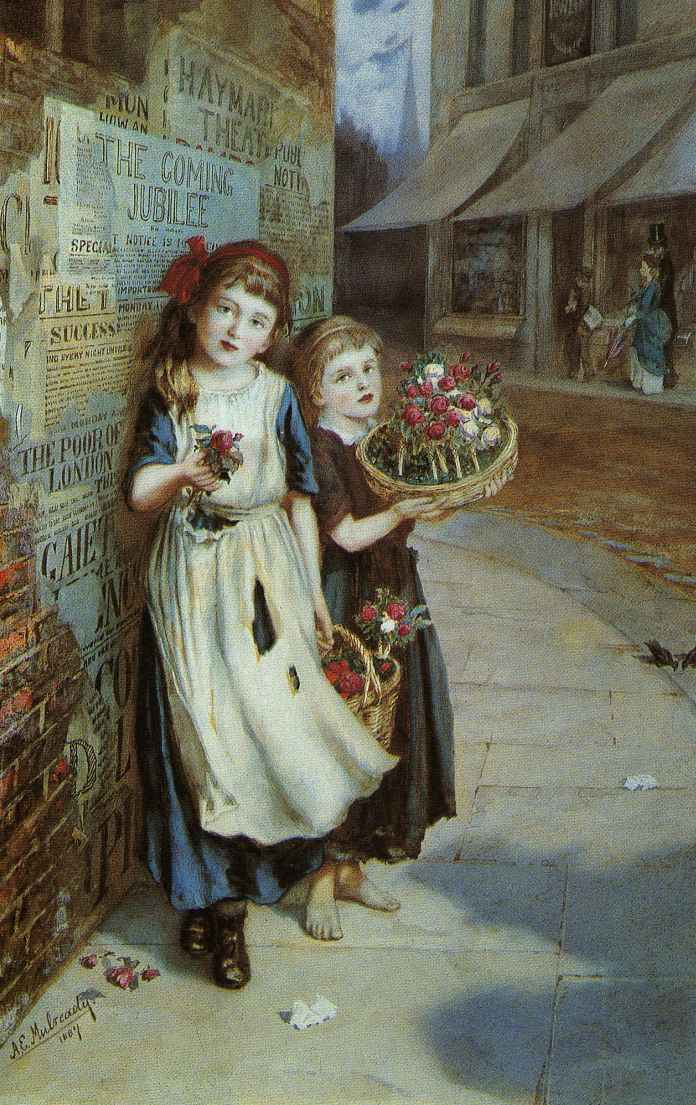
Little Flower Sellers (1887)

From 1870, Mulready was associated with the Cranbrook Colony of artists, living, from 1871, at Waterloo Place, next door to F D Hardy. He returned to London in 1874. Being much younger than other members of the colony, he had little in common with them, and his art reflected on social issues of the day, particularly on the poverty experienced by children their struggle with adult problems - no over-sentimental rural or domestic scenes by him are known. He often depicted London street scenes with urchins and poor flower-sellers, such as 'A Day's Reckoning' and 'Sounds of Revelry', shown in 1886 at the Hanover Gallery, and 'A Flower Girl in a Red Shawl' and 'A Newspaper Boy Selling Papers' displayed at Walker's Gallery in Liverpool in 1887.

A large-scale painting "Homeless by Night" was exhibited in 1892 at the Atkinson Art Gallery, Southport, and described as a large painful picture, shows a number of gutter children of both sexes, preparing to sleep under one of the Landseer's lions in Trafalgar Square." A special feature of his paintings is the inclusion of street posters in the background, the text of which creates additional social and political context for the depicted scene. In this sense, his artworks correspond with problems raised by social activists of the era. Charles Dickens novels also influenced Mulready's paintings, such as “Hard Times” (1877, private collection). He was even described as 'a sentimental social realist'.

Mulready also occasionally experimented with landscape painting: In 1880, at Christie's, three of his small landscapes were sold - The Backward Course: A Sunny Day, A Rainy Afternoon and A Wintry Ave

Little is known about Mulready's private life. According to the England and Wales marriage index, Mulready married Maria in 1874 - the couple had two children: Claude Augustus, born in 1875 and Eleanor Julia, born in 1877.
