= Cranbrook Colony =

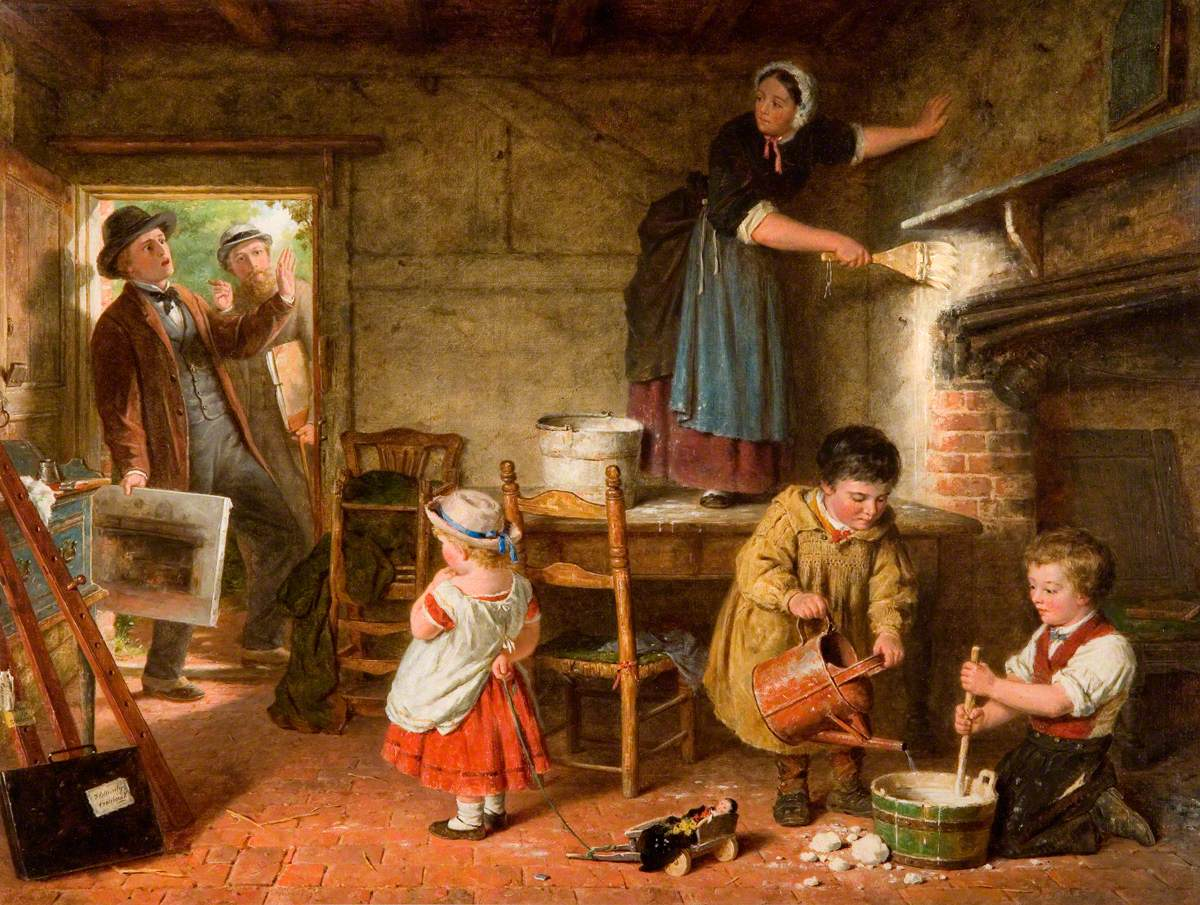
The Dismayed Artist by Frederick Daniel Hardy, 1866. The painting makes reference to the Cranbrook Colony.

The Cranbrook Colony was a group of artists who settled in Cranbrook, Kent from 1853 onwards and were inspired by seventeenth-century Dutch and Flemish painters. They have been referred to as 'genre' painters as they tended to paint scenes of the everyday life that they saw around them in the rural area of Kent where they lived, typically scenes of domestic life; cooking and washing, children playing and other family activities.

The group started with the painter Frederick Daniel Hardy who liked the countryside around Cranbrook and settled there in 1853. He was joined there after four years by his mentor, Thomas Webster, their studio being an old house in the High Street, of which Hardy occupied the ground floor.

The group evolved in a rather loose and informal manner. Other artists who soon joined Hardy and Webster were Frederick Hardy's brother George Hardy, John Callcott Horsley, and George Bernard O'Neill (who married Horsley's cousin Emma Callcott), with George Henry Boughton and Augustus Mulready frequently visiting. The artists and their families formed strong bonds and were active in their local community, playing a philanthropic role in Cranbrook

Their works were mainly romanticized views of the countryside and sentimental images of bucolic simplicity which proved extremely saleable to the industrialists of the Midlands.

"The Cranbrook style was enormously popular, and had many imitators," including William Henry Knight; its artists continued a tradition "of small old-masterish pictures until the end of the century."

== Gallery ==
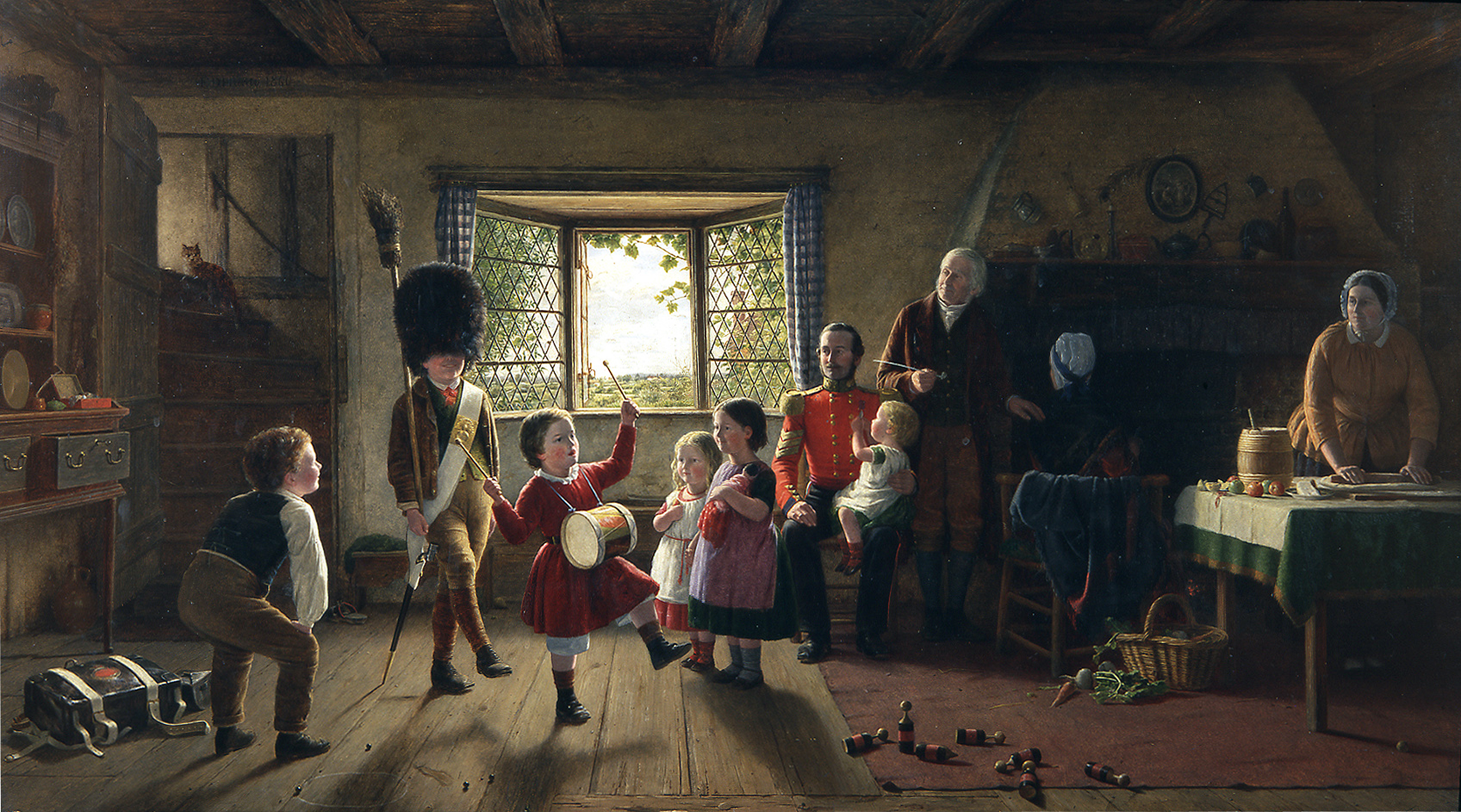
The Volunteers by Frederick Daniel Hardy, 1860

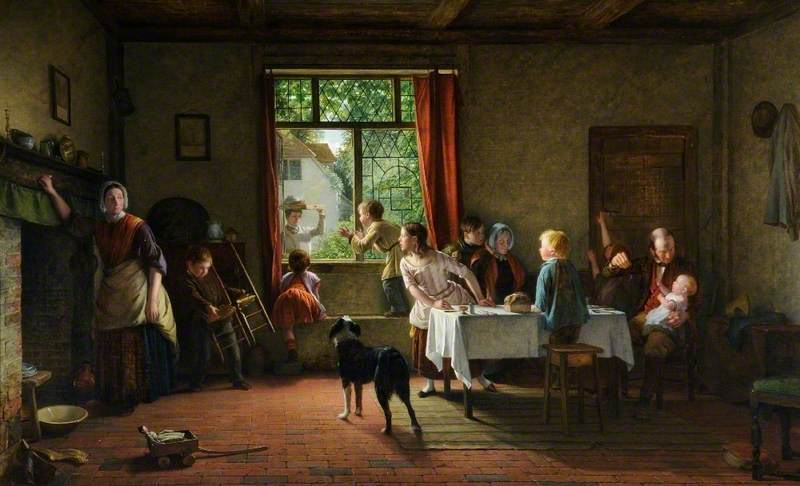
Roast Pig by Thomas Webster, 1862

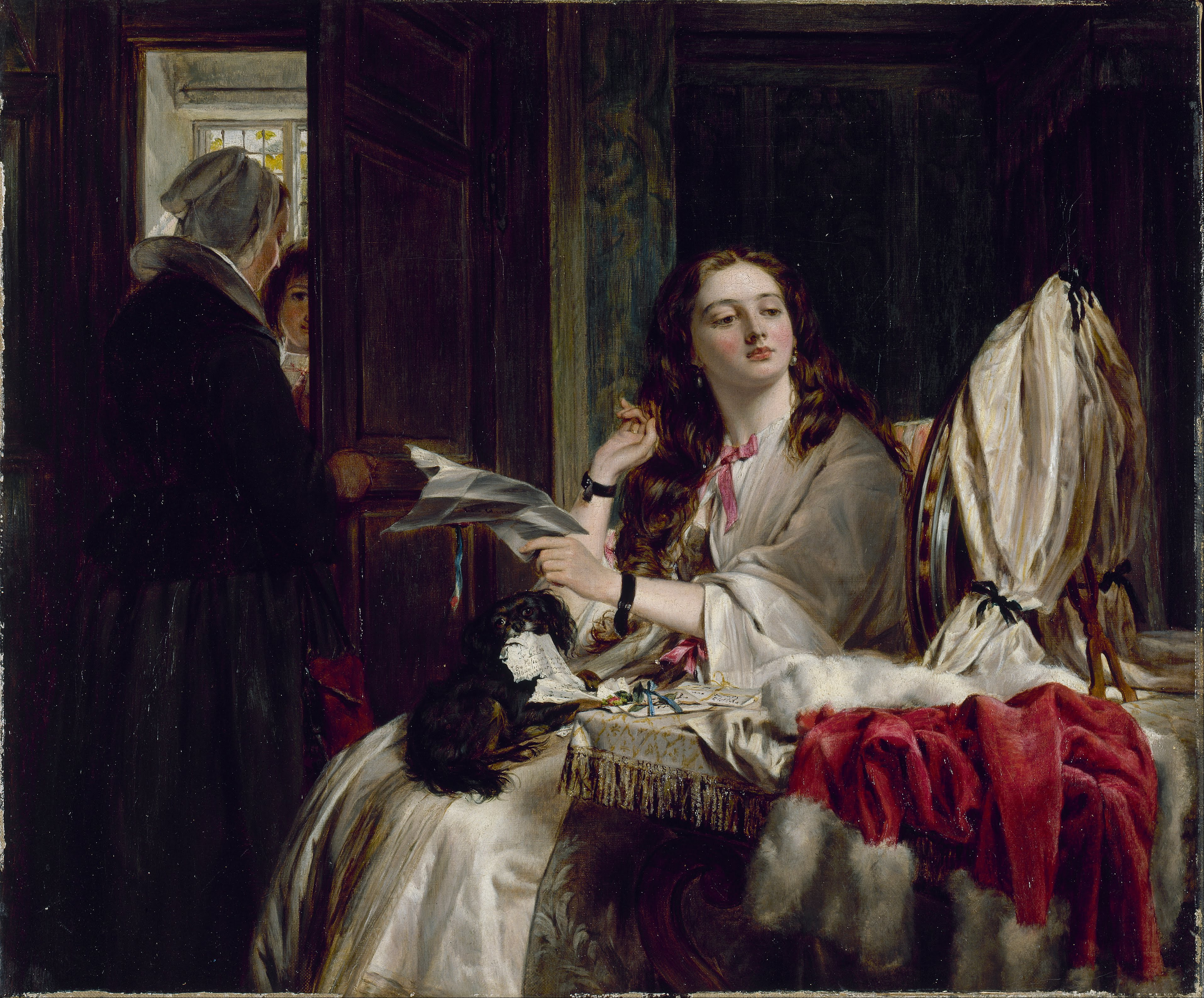
The Morning of St Valentine by John Callcott Horsley, 1863

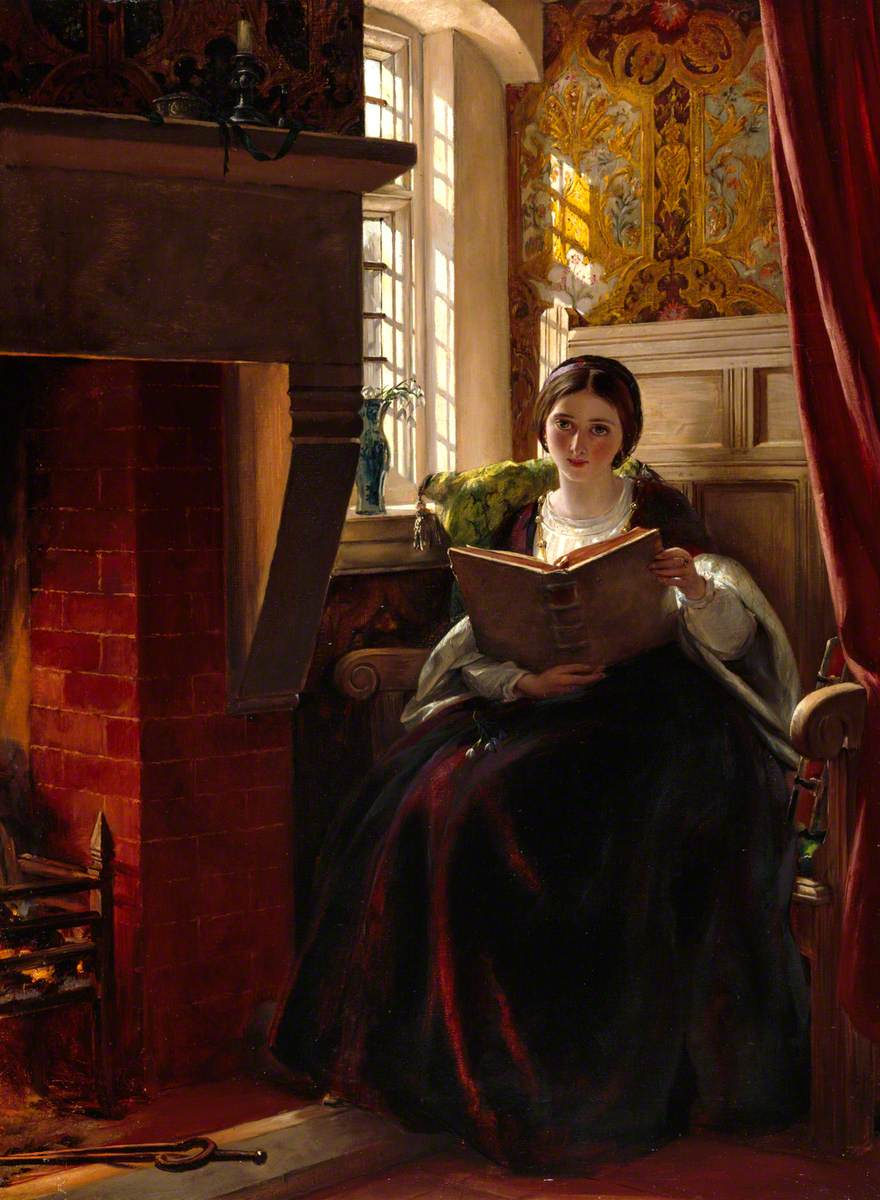
A Pleasant Corner by John Callcott Horsley, 1865

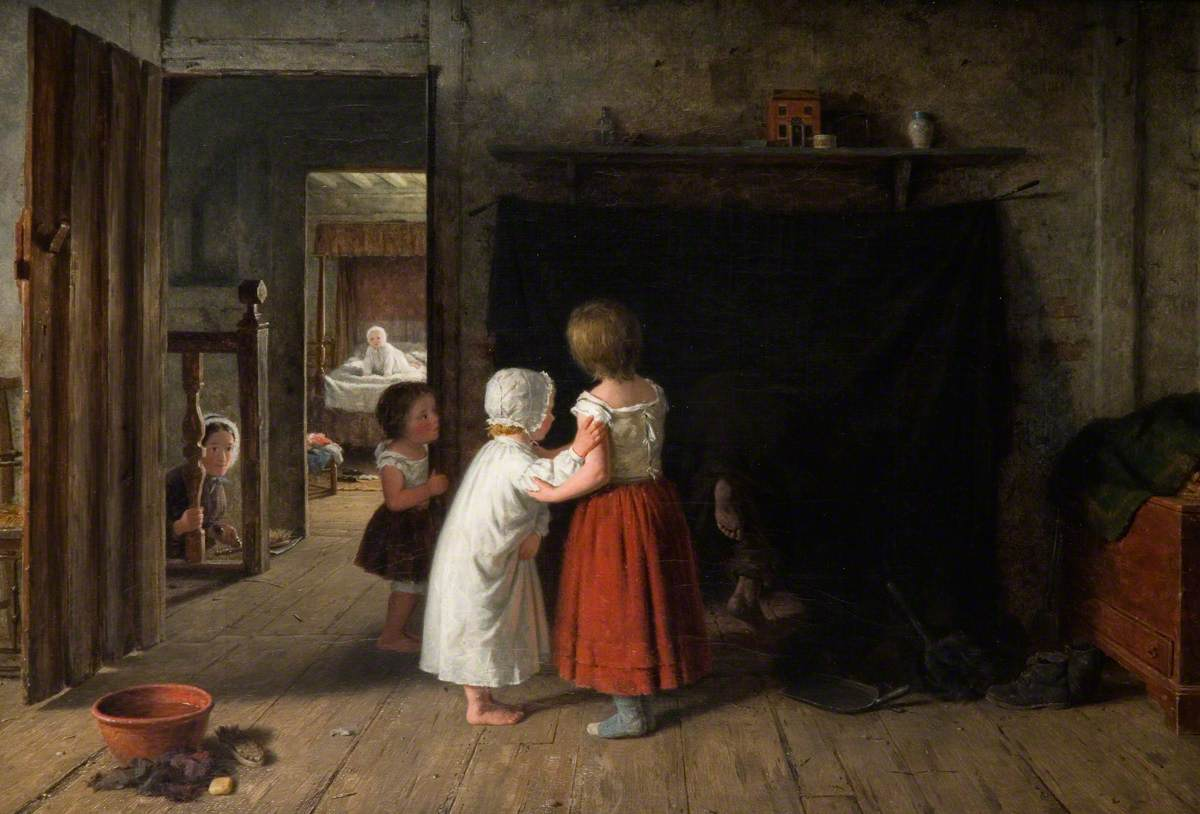
The Chimney Sweep by Frederick Daniel Hardy, 1866

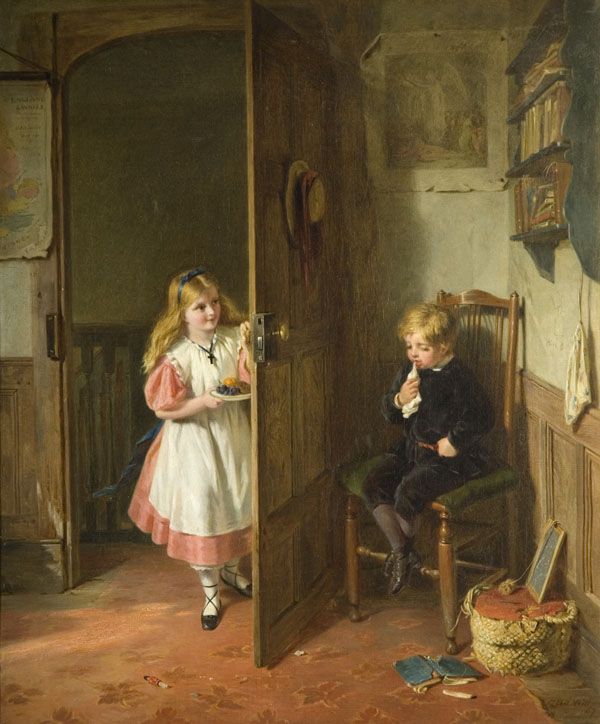
The Naughty Boy by George Bernard O'Neill, 1867

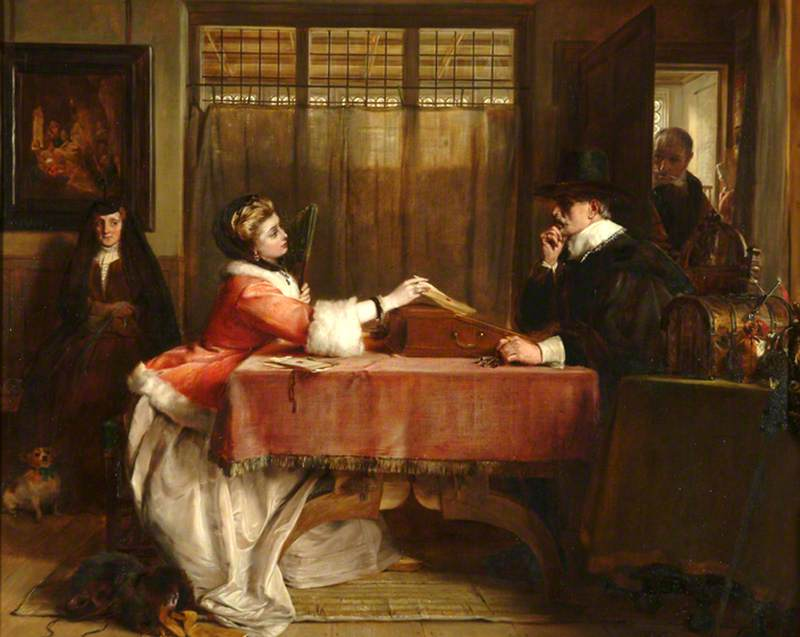
The Banker's Private Room, Negotiating a Loan by John Callcott Horsley, 1870

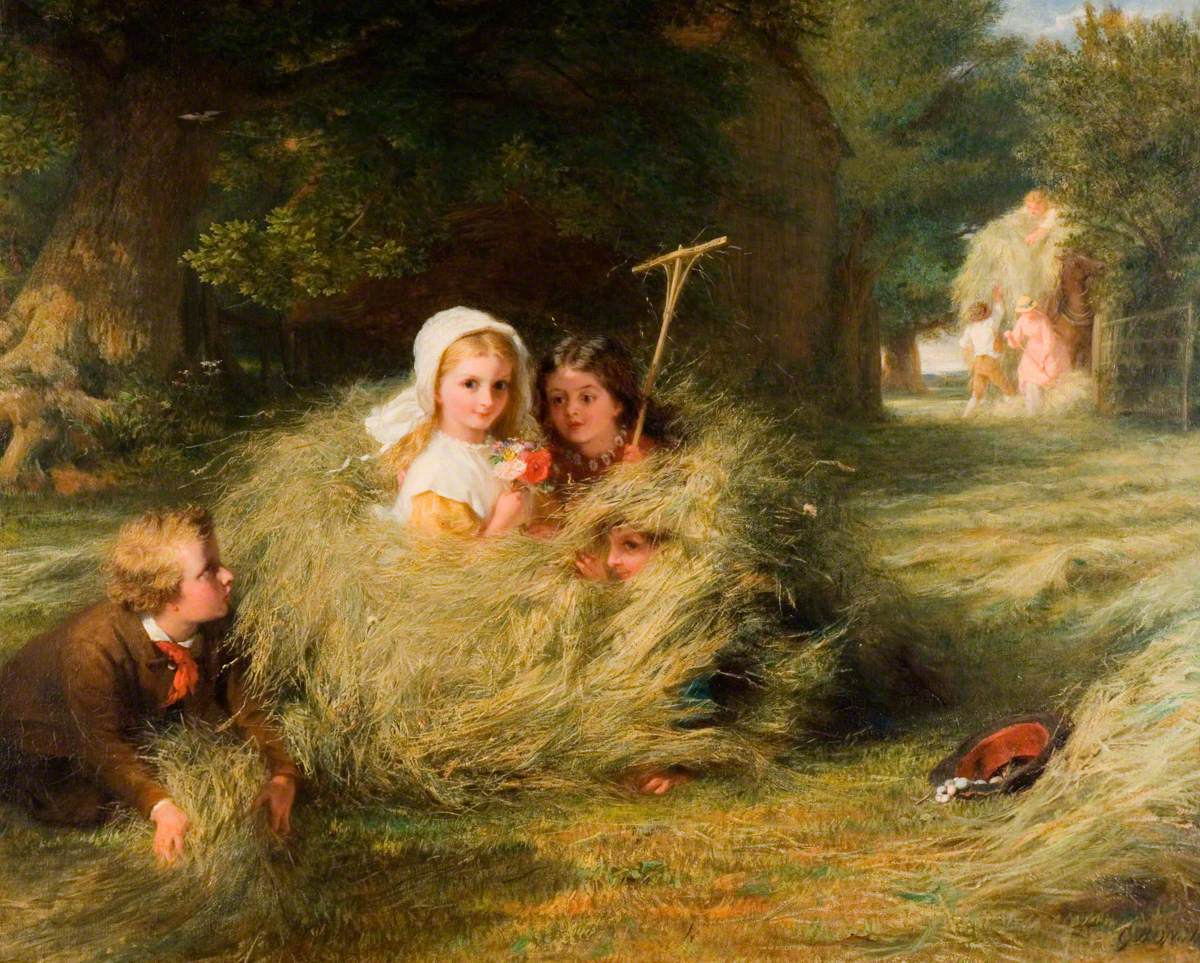
Nestlings by George Bernard O'Neill, 1870
