= George Hardy (artist) =

English painter

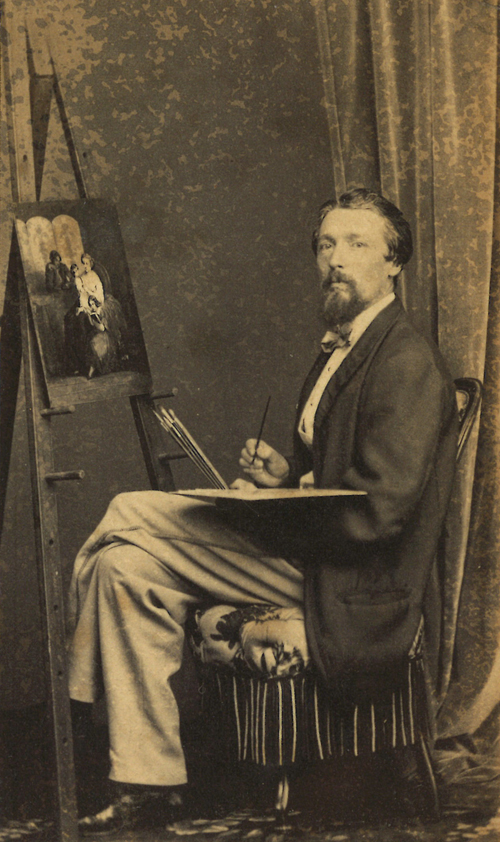
- Photograph by Vernouil Photography, ca. 1862
- Born: 21 November 1822; Brighton, Sussex
- Died: 20 November 1909 (aged 86); Warbleton, Sussex
- Known for: Genre painting. Cottage interiors

George Hardy (1822–1909) was an English genre painter, a member of the Cranbrook Colony and eldest brother of the artist Frederick Daniel Hardy.

== Early life ==
George Hardy was born at Brighton in Sussex, the eldest of eight children of George Hardy (1795–1877) and his wife Sarah (née Lloyd) (1803–1872). George's father was a horn player in the Private Band of Music of the Royal Households of George IV, Queen Adelaide and Queen Victoria. His father was also an amateur artist, taught by James Duffield Harding and Edmund Bristow. George Hardy's ancestors were from Horsforth in Yorkshire; Gathorne Gathorne-Hardy, First Earl of Cranbrook, was his second cousin.

George Hardy was admitted to the Royal Academy Schools in 1841 on the recommendation of Thomas Webster who was a family friend and was related to Hardy's mother.

== The Cranbrook Colony ==
Hardy's paintings of cottage interiors reflect the influence of Thomas Webster and Dutch genre painters of the seventeenth century, as can be seen for example in The Leisure Hour (1855). During the 1850s George Hardy helped his younger brother Frederick Daniel, in particular to improve his painting of human figures. They collaborated on a few paintings.

Hardy's travels in Normandy provided subjects for several paintings exhibited at the Royal Academy. La Soeur de Charité (1866) is a study of a fisherman's cottage in France. Hardy exhibited 41 paintings at the Royal Academy between 1846 and 1892.

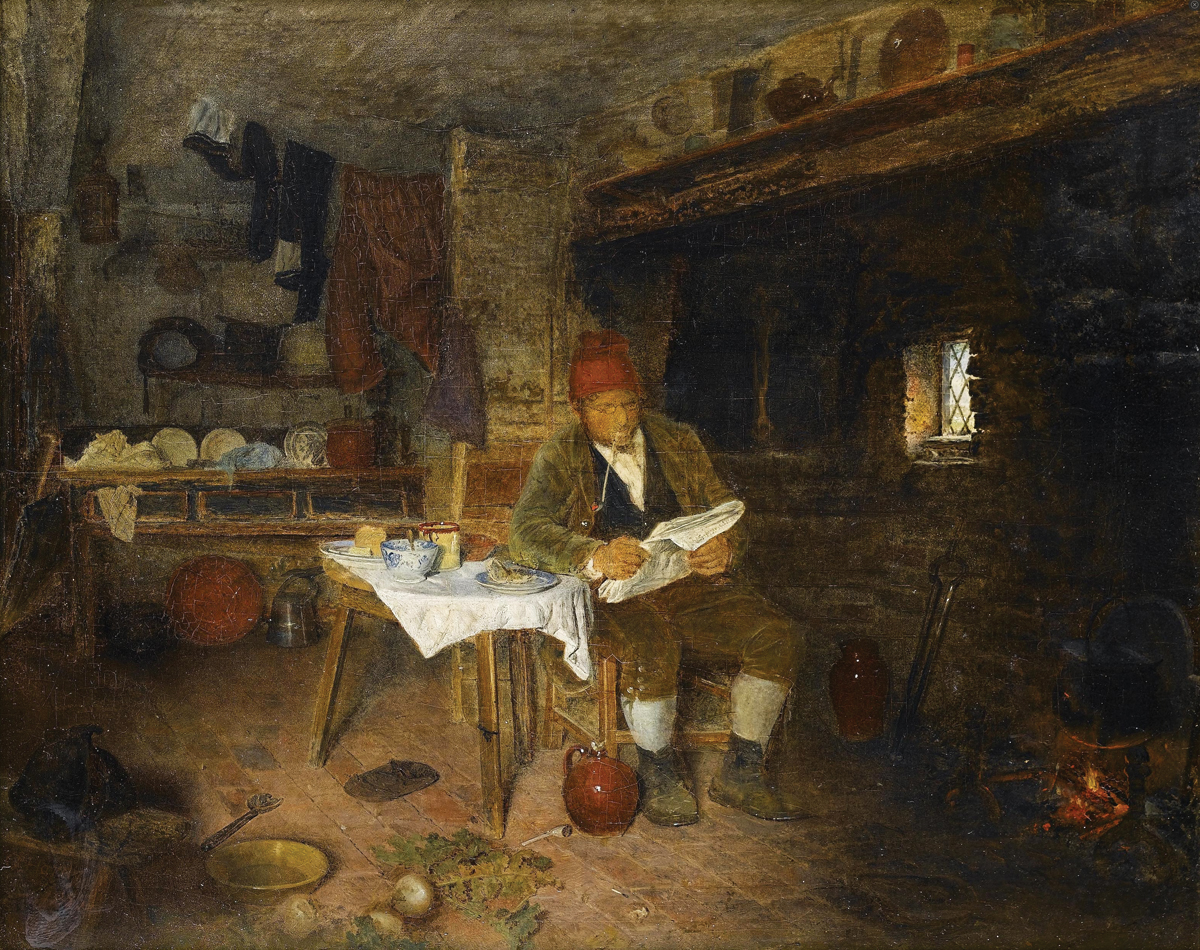
The Leisure Hour, (1855). George Hardy

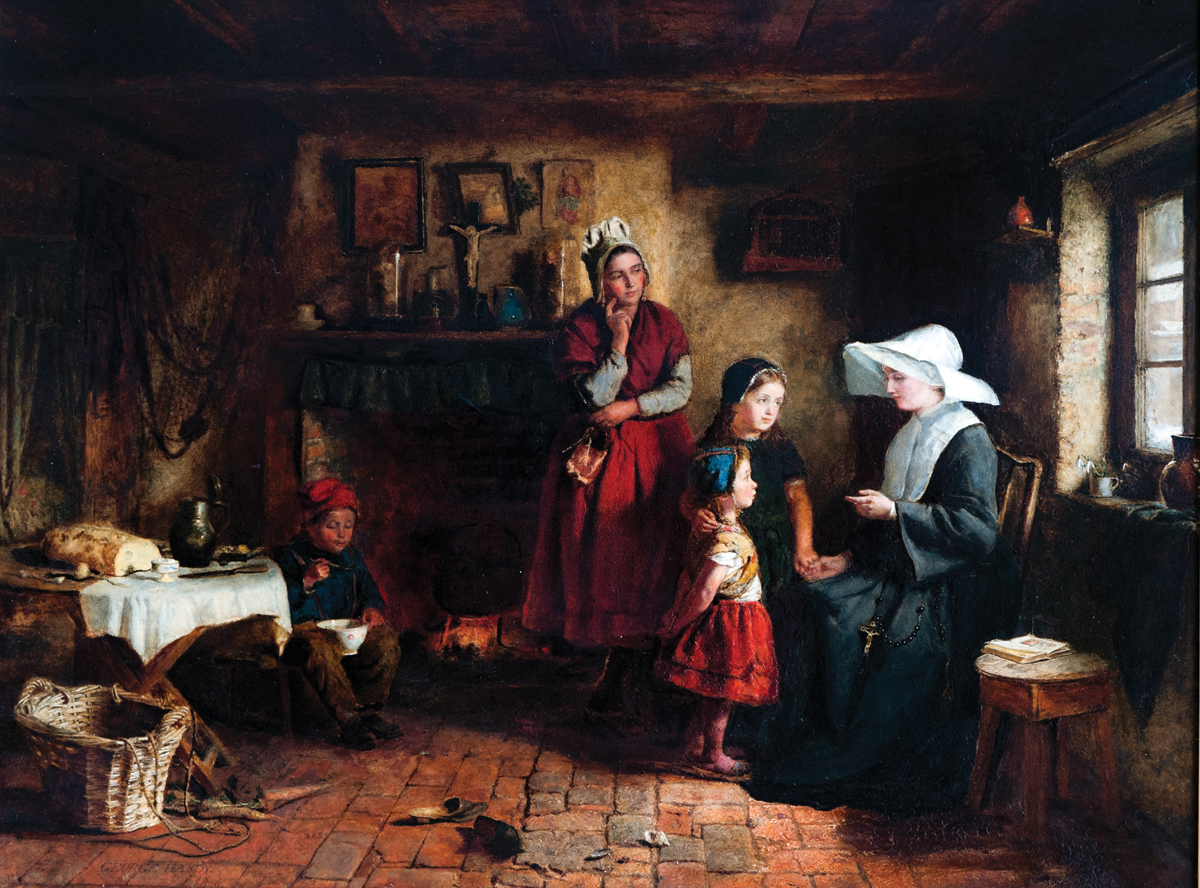
La Soeur de Charité, (1866). George Hardy

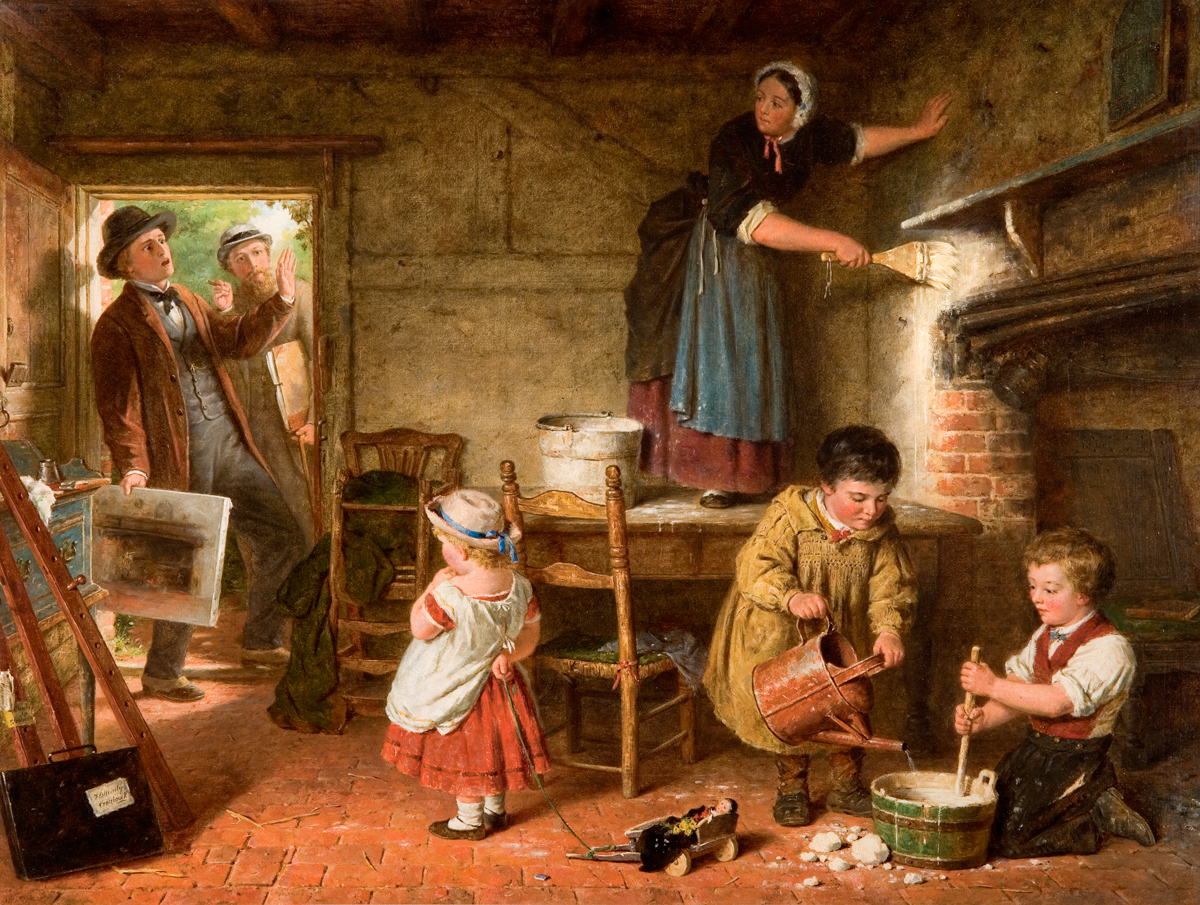
The Dismayed Artist, (1866). Frederick Daniel Hardy

After his marriage in May 1862 to Ellen Hutton (1833-1894) Hardy lived at Cranbrook in Kent and was a member of the Cranbrook Colony of artists. He is depicted behind his brother Frederick Daniel Hardy in The Dismayed Artist (1866) painted by F.D. Hardy. In the picture F.D. Hardy has just arrived to continue his work, but is dismayed to see that the picturesque walls are being covered with whitewash. The idea for the painting might be related to a comment in The Art Journal about George Hardy's Royal Academy exhibit, Interior of an English Cottage (1849): “Every brick in the floor is marked; it is a successful story in all but the white round the fireplace.”

George and Ellen Hardy had four children. Following the death of his wife, George Hardy lived with his daughter Louise and her husband Rev. Charles Pratt at Eastbourne and then at Warbleton in Sussex where he died in 1909, aged 86. George Hardy's youngest daughter Marguerite Ellen was an artist who painted mountain scenes in the Khyber Pass following her marriage to Professor Llewellyn Tipping, one of the founders of Islamia College, Peshawar and its first principal.
