= The Inn Where No Man Rests =

L'Auberge du Bon Repos
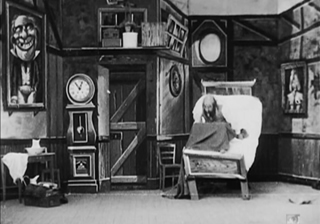
- Directed by: Georges Méliès
- Starring: Georges Méliès
- Production company: Star Film Company
- Release date: June 27, 1903 (US)
- Running time: 100 meters
- Country: France
- Language: Silent

L'Auberge du bon repos, sold in the United States as The Inn Where No Man Rests and in Britain as The Inn of "Good Rest", is a 1903 French silent comic trick film by Georges Méliès. Set in an inn, the film addresses the state of the drunken mind with light heartedness.

== Production ==
The Inn Where No Man Rests (1903)

The Inn Where No Man Rests is an expanded version of an earlier Méliès film, The Bewitched Inn (1897). The Moon and a manic chase, as featured in the film, are both common motifs in Méliès's work. As usual for his films, the chase here is circular, within a single set; however, Méliès did eventually try the linear, multi-scene chase format of his contemporaries (such as Ferdinand Zecca and Lucien Nonguet) in his film A Desperate Crime.

Méliès himself plays the traveler in the film. The table and pendulum are animated using stage machinery; other objects are pulled or suspended using wire, and additional effects are worked using substitution splices. The Inn Where No Man Rests was sold by Méliès's Star Film Company and is numbered 465–469 in its catalogues.
