= The Christmas Angel =

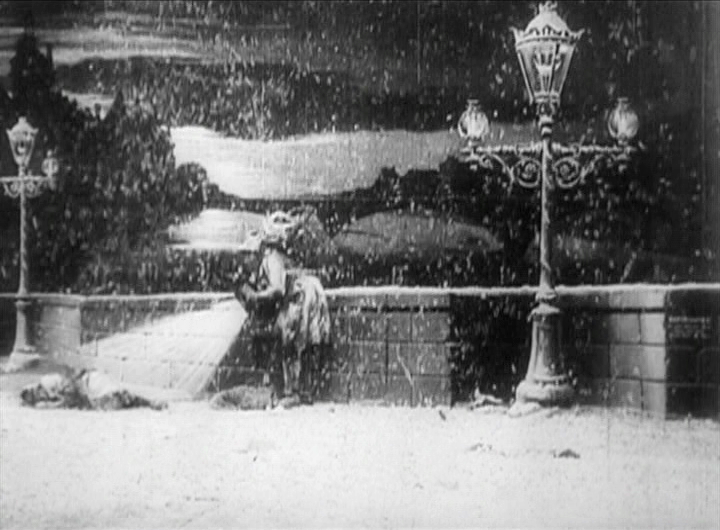
- The rag-and-bone man encounters the beggar girl in a scene from the film
- Directed by: Georges Méliès
- Starring: Rachel Gillet; Georges Méliès
- Production company: Star Film Company
- Release date: 1904
- Country: France
- Language: Silent

Détresse et Charité, released in the United States as The Christmas Angel and in Britain as The Beggar Maiden, is a 1904 French short silent film directed by Georges Méliès. It was released by Méliès's Star Film Company and is numbered 669–677 in its catalogues.

== Plot ==
At Christmas time, a girl and her family live in poverty; the girl's mother is ill and bedridden. The father asks the girl to go to nearby Paris, and beg for alms. The girl finds a church, but she is pushed aside by the professional beggars working on its steps, and is unable to get alms. She tries to ask for food at a bakery, but is thrown out again. As night falls, she collapses and falls asleep; a rag-and-bone man takes pity on her, shares his piece of bread with her, and gives her his shawl. After thanking the rag-and-bone man and saying goodbye, the girl moves on. Alone in a snowstorm, she collapses again.

Two endings for the film were made. In the version for French audiences, the beggar girl freezes to death after her collapse, and her soul is brought to Heaven by the Christmas Angel of the title. In the version for British and American audiences, a rich couple passing by in an automobile rescue the girl, bring her home, and lavish gifts upon her family. As the film historian Elizabeth Ezra has noted, "these differences suggest that the American audience's predilection for a happy ending was already well in place by the turn of the century."

== Production ==
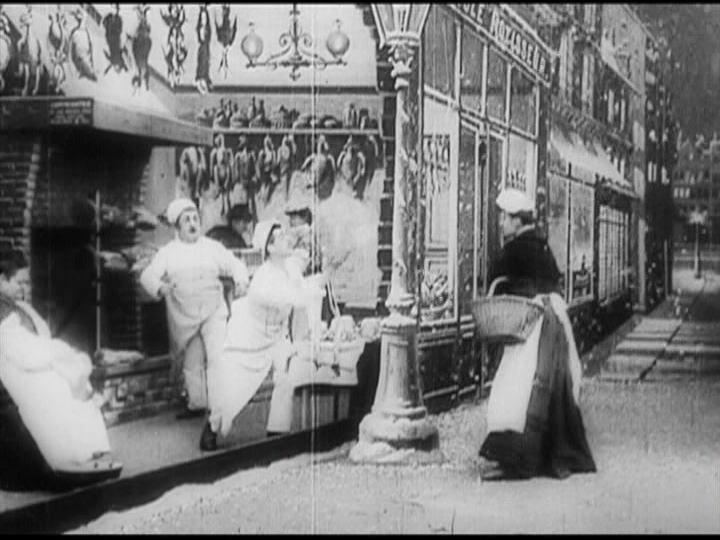
The bakery set, designed in cross-section

Méliès plays three roles in the film: the rag-and-bone man, a beggar on crutches, and a coal seller. The main role of the beggar girl is played by Rachel Gillet. (According to the American catalogue, which repeatedly emphasizes that the film is set in Paris, the character's name is Marie.) The automobile seen in the British and American ending was reused in Méliès's later film An Adventurous Automobile Trip. The film leans more heavily on realism than is usual for Méliès, pointing to his attempts to change his fantasy-driven style to fit popular cinema trends.

Special effects used in the film include pyrotechnics, artificial snow, superimpositions, and dissolves. The film is also notable for including a cross-section set, allowing Méliès to show both the inside and the outside of the bakery; other Méliès films featuring cross-section scenery include The Impossible Voyage, A Roadside Inn, The Chimney Sweep, and Tunnelling the English Channel. Another scenic effect occurs when the rag-and-bone man comes across the beggar girl; when he turns on his lantern to get a better look at her, a simulated stream of light, painted in white on the scenery, is added using a substitution splice.

A stencil-colored print of the film is held at the Filmoteca de Catalunya. It is unknown whether Méliès authorized the coloring, as the stencil process is highly unusual in his oeuvre; normally, his films were colored using an entirely freehand method supervised by the colorist Elisabeth Thuillier.

== See also ==
- List of films about angels
- List of Christmas films
