= The Dismayed Artist =

Painting by Frederick Daniel Hardy

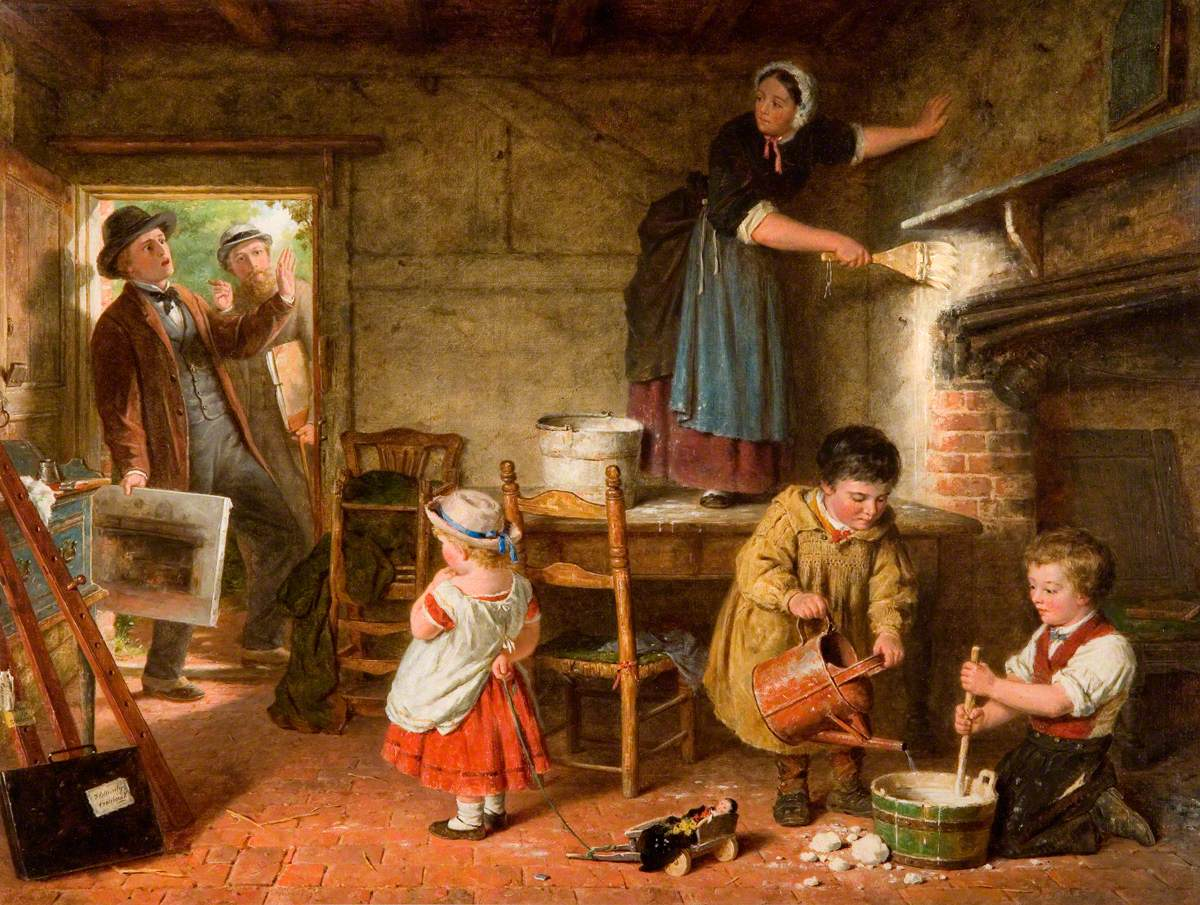
- Artist: Frederick Daniel Hardy
- Year: 1866
- Type: Oil on panel, genre painting
- Dimensions: 45.5 cm × 61 cm (17.9 in × 24 in)
- Location: Wolverhampton Art Gallery, Wolverhampton

The Dismayed Artist is an 1866 oil painting by the British artist Frederick Daniel Hardy. A genre painting, it features several self-referential nods to the Cranbrook Colony of artists of which he was a prominent member. Hardy had frequently painted scenes of cottage interiors. However the artist show arriving at the rural cottage to complete the canvas he is holding is dismayed to find the family are whitewashing the walls. That the artist is clearly intended to be himself is shown by the initials on his easel and paintbox and the words Charing Cross to Staplehurst, show he had travelled by train The figure behind him in the doorway is his brother George Hardy.

The painting was displayed at the Royal Academy Exhibition of 1866 held at the National Gallery in London. It was subsequently acquired by the Wolverhampton Art Gallery, having been donated by the widow of the toy manufacturer and art collector Sidney Cartwright in 1887.

== Bibliography ==
- Lübbren, Nina. Narrative Painting in Nineteenth-century Europe. Manchester University Press, 2023.
- Payne, Christiana. Rustic Simplicity: Scenes of Cottage Life in Nineteenth-century British Art. Djanogly Art Gallery, 1998.
- Roe, Sonia & Ellis, Andrew. Oil Paintings in Public Ownership in Staffordshire. Public Catalogue Foundation, 2007.
- Thompson, Carol (ed.) The Cranbrook Colony: Fresh Perspectives. Wolverhampton Art Gallery, 2010.
