= Frederick Daniel Hardy =

English painter

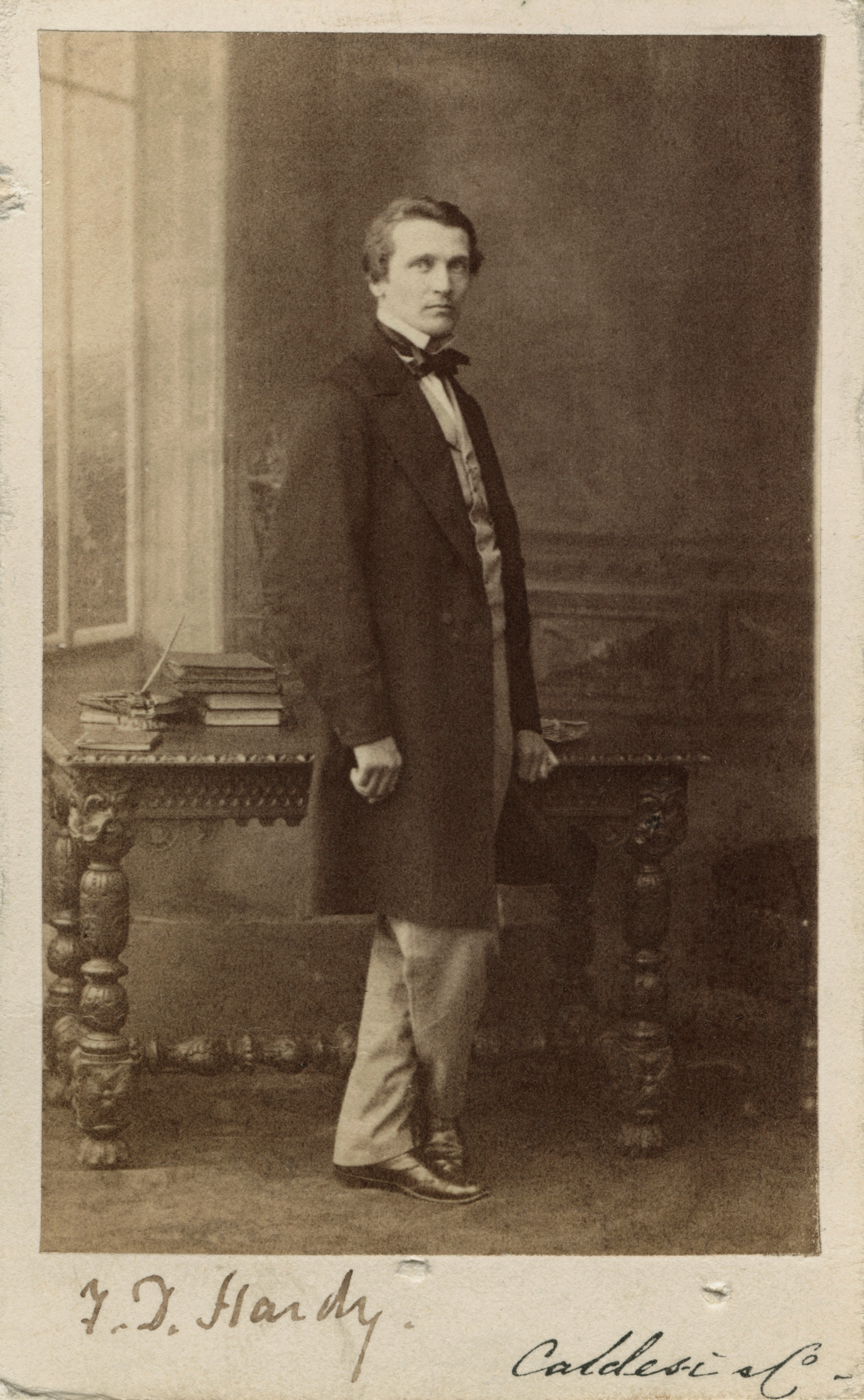
- Photograph by Leonida Caldesi, ca. 1865
- Born: 13 February 1827; Windsor, Berkshire, England
- Died: 1 April 1911 (aged 84); Cranbrook, Kent, England
- Known for: Genre painting. Cottage interiors

Frederick Daniel Hardy (13 February 1827 – 1 April 1911) was an English genre painter and member of the Cranbrook Colony of artists.

== Early life ==
Frederick Daniel Hardy was born at Windsor in Berkshire, the third of eight children of George Hardy (1795–1877) and his wife Sarah (1803–1872). George Hardy was a horn player in the Private Band of Music of the Royal Households of George IV, Queen Adelaide and Queen Victoria. Frederick's father was also an amateur artist, taught by James Duffield Harding and Edmund Bristow. F. D. Hardy's ancestors were from Horsforth in Yorkshire; Gathorne Gathorne-Hardy, First Earl of Cranbrook, was his second cousin.

Frederick enrolled at the Royal Academy of Music, Hanover Square, at the age of seventeen. He studied for about three years, but finally abandoned music to become an artist like his elder brother George Hardy (1822–1909).

== The 1850s: early paintings of cottage interiors ==
Hardy soon became a skilful painter of cottage interiors, but was continually improving his figure painting throughout the 1850s. Christopher Wood, writer on Victorian Art, commented on one of Hardy's earliest paintings, Cottage Fireside (1850): “Some of his early works of this kind are beautifully observed, and quite unsentimental, omitting the usual children, pets and other familiar props of the cottage idyll painters. The old kitchen... is delineated as dispassionately as a Dutch seventeenth century kitchen by Ostade or Brekelenkamp.”

In 1851 Hardy had his first two pictures accepted for exhibition at the Royal Academy. On 11 March 1852 he married Rebecca Sophia Dorofield (1827–1906). They lived at Snell's Wood, near Amersham in Buckinghamshire, three miles from the farm of Rebecca's parents. Their first child was born there in March 1853. By July 1853 they had moved to 2 Waterloo Place at Cranbrook, Kent, a house that Hardy kept all his life.

Hardy's painting in the 1850s was influenced by the works of 17th Dutch artists, such as Pieter de Hooch and Nicolaes Maes, and by the paintings of his friend Thomas Webster. He also kept a photograph album and used photographs when painting some of his pictures. Throughout the decade Hardy gradually included a few figures into his pictures of interiors. And in 1859 he painted his first picture, The Foreign Guest, that has a narrative involving a larger group of people, and is similar to much of his best work in the 1860s.

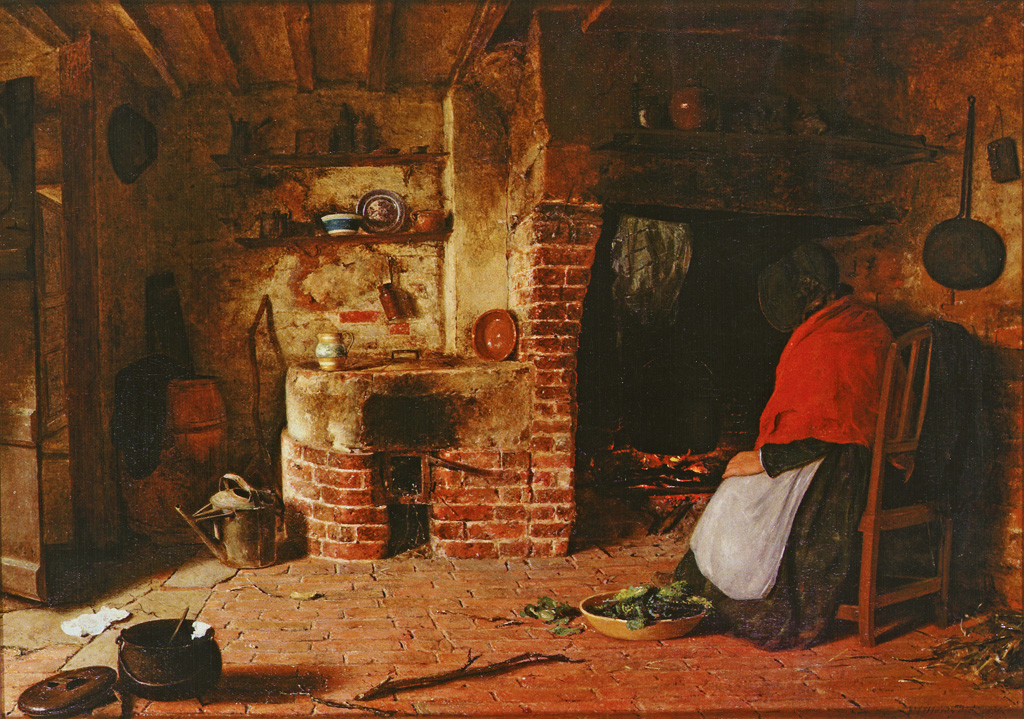
Cottage Fireside (1850)

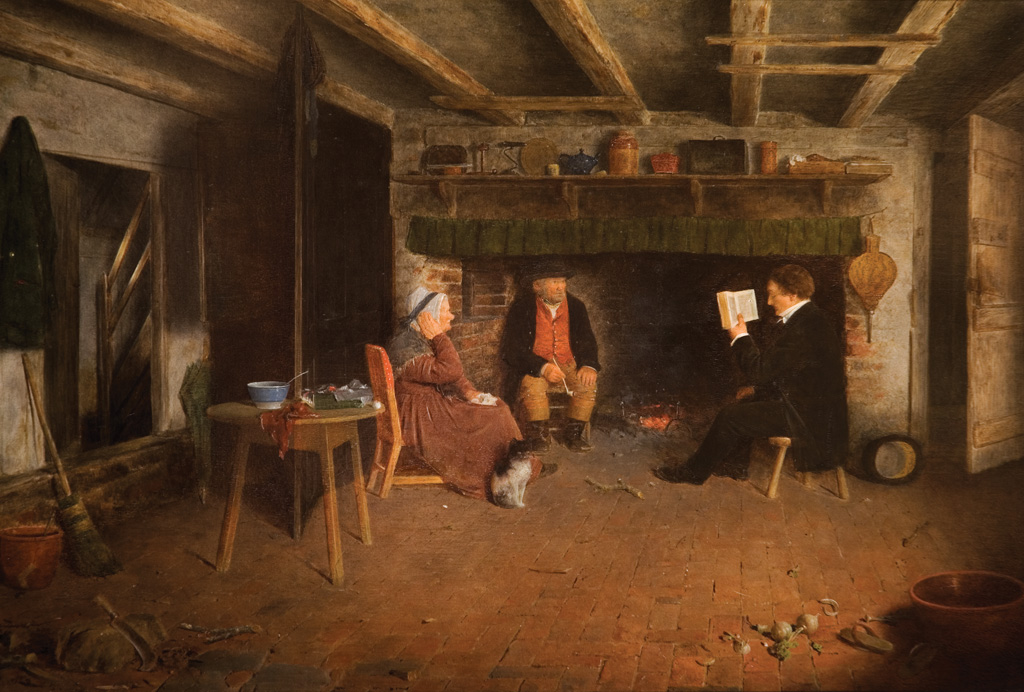
The Clergyman's Visit (ca. 1854)

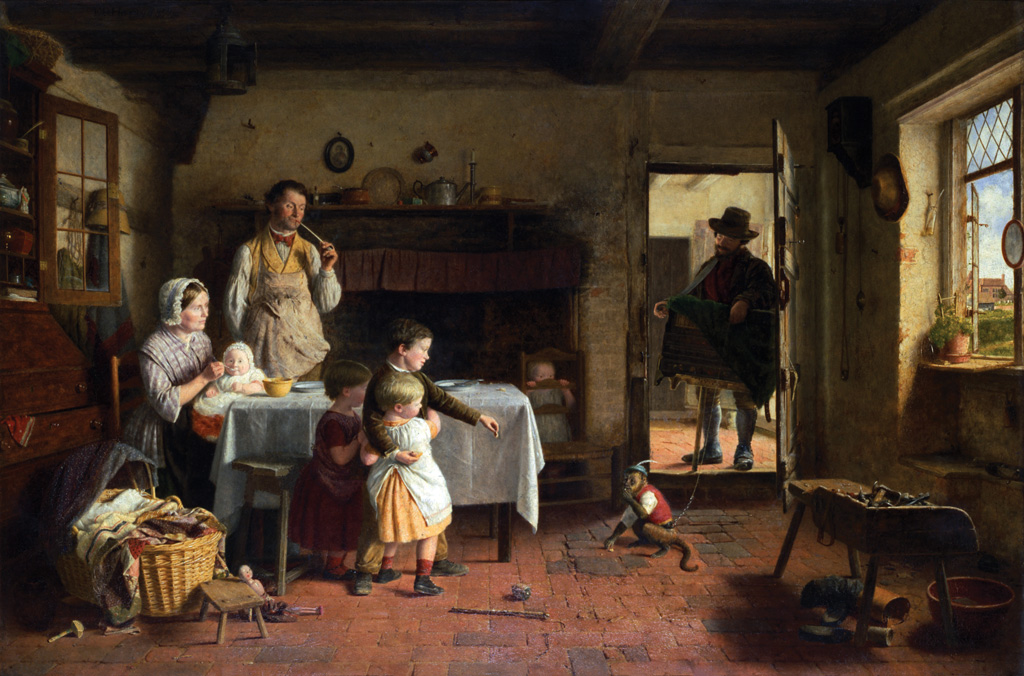
The Foreign Guest (1859)

== The 1860s and beyond ==
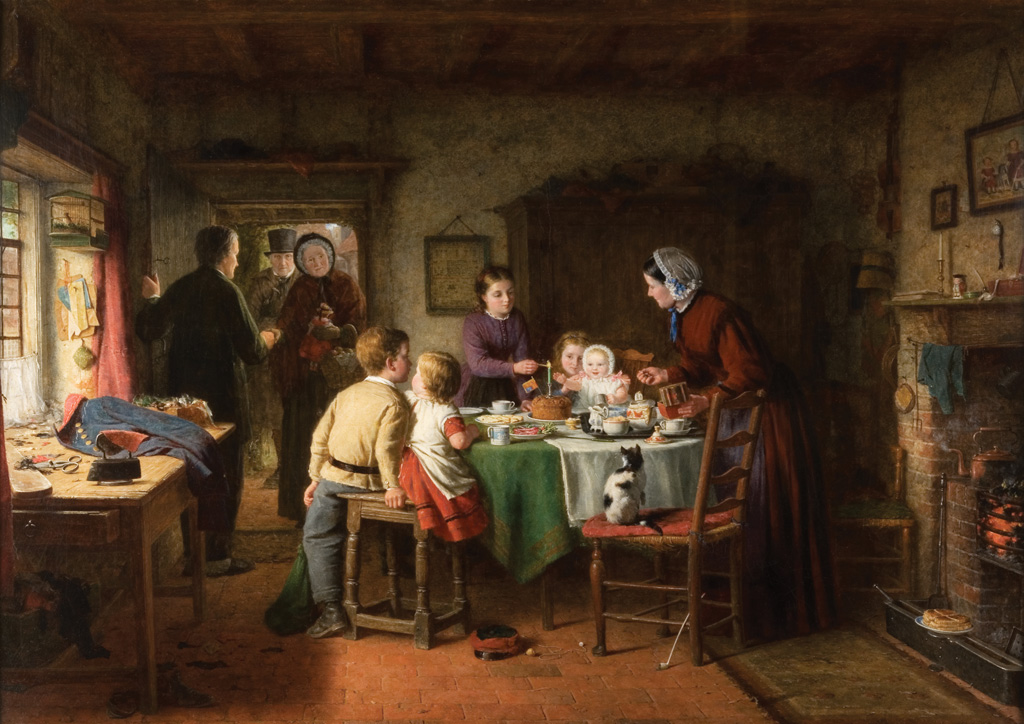
Baby's Birthday (1867)

During the 1860s Hardy painted the pictures for which he is best known, particularly paintings of children's activities such as The Volunteers (1860), Early Sorrow (1861), The Sweep (1862), The Young Photographers (1862), The Doctor (1863), The Leaky Roof (1865), The Dismayed Artist (1866) and Baby’s Birthday (1867). Hardy painted at least ten versions of The Sweep, one of his most popular paintings.

Some of his paintings from the 1870s were more critical of Victorian society. Looking for Father (1873) portrays a barefoot girl looking through the glass panel of an alehouse door for her father. After the Party (1875) depicts an exhausted servant who has fallen asleep, sitting on a chair, after serving at a party. And The Wedding Dress (1875) portrays a group of seamstresses who have had to work through the night to finish their work.

Hardy exhibited ninety-three pictures at the Royal Academy from 1851 to 1898. The sale prices of his paintings were at their peak in the 1870s; in 1877 A Quartette Party (1872) and A Wedding Breakfast (1871) were each sold for £798 at Christie's. From the mid-1870s the Hardys maintained a house in London, at 17 Brunswick Gardens in Kensington, as well as their house in Cranbrook. F.D. Hardy's work is to be found in numerous public collections, notably at the Wolverhampton Art Gallery which holds nineteen of his paintings.

== Life in Cranbrook. Family ==
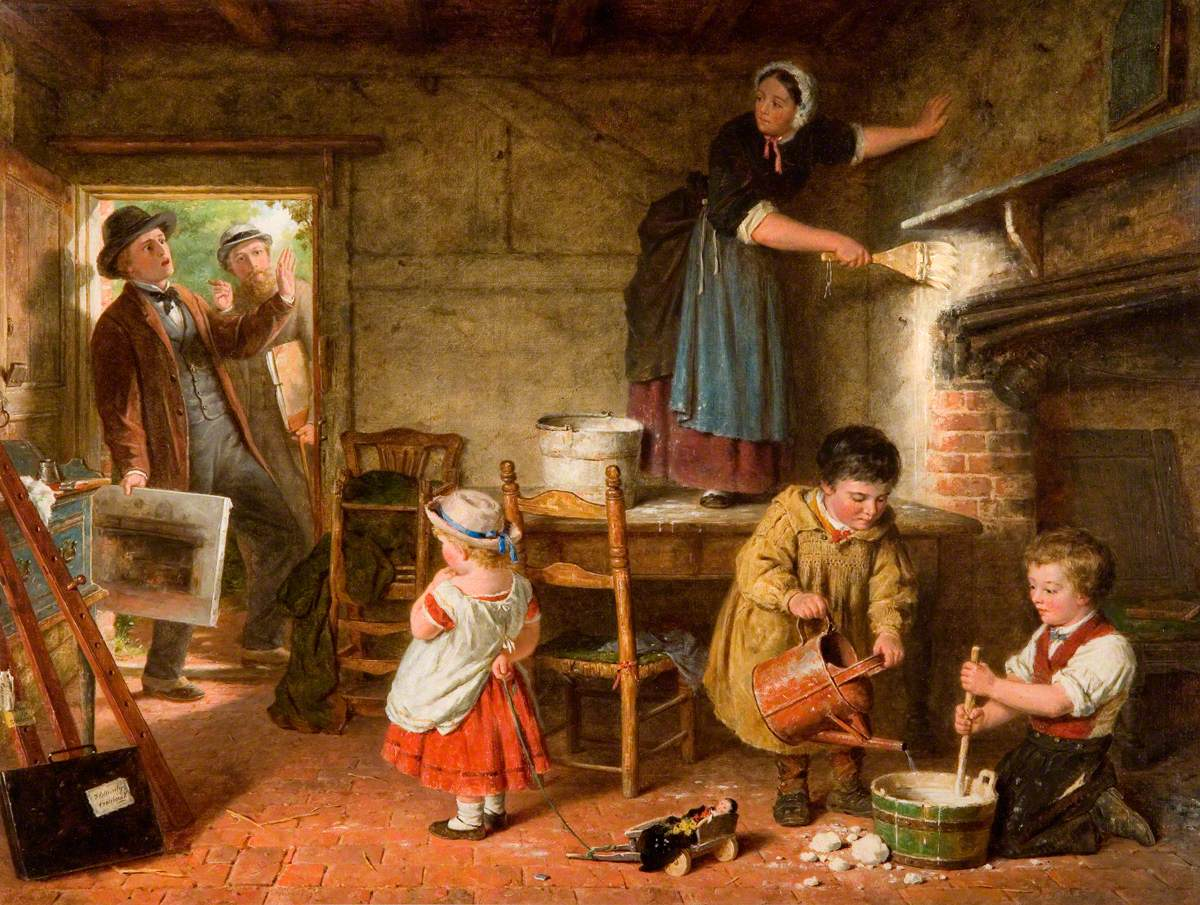
The Dismayed Artist, 1866

About four years after Hardy settled in Cranbrook his friend Thomas Webster, who was related to Hardy's mother, came to live there. For their studios, Hardy and Webster rented a sixteenth-century house in High Street; Hardy's studio was the front room on the ground floor and Webster's studio was the front room above. Several more artists, friends of Webster and Hardy, and Frederick's elder brother George, came to live in Cranbrook or were frequent visitors from London; they became known as the Cranbrook Colony.

The Cranbrook artists and their families often met for dinners, teas and parties. Hardy was involved in many activities in Cranbrook: he was an officer in the 37th Kent Rifle Volunteer Corps, a Churchwarden, a Committee member of the Literary Association, a Member of the Cricket Club and a participant at musical evenings in the town.

Frederick and Rebecca Hardy had four sons and a daughter. Their eldest son Frederick (1853-1937), attended the Royal Academy Schools and became an artist, using the name “Dorofield Hardy”. Their fourth son, Edwin George (1859-1896), became an architect after studying at the Royal Academy Schools where he won a gold medal for design in architecture and a travelling scholarship for studies in Italy. Frederick's father, George Hardy, came to live with him in 1873. George Hardy died at Cranbrook in 1877.

Frederick Daniel Hardy died at Cranbrook in April 1911 and was buried beside his wife in St Dunstan's churchyard. After Hardy's death, his daughter Amelia Gertrude Hardy (1865-1952), an amateur artist, lived in Hardy's former studio in the High Street.

== Gallery ==
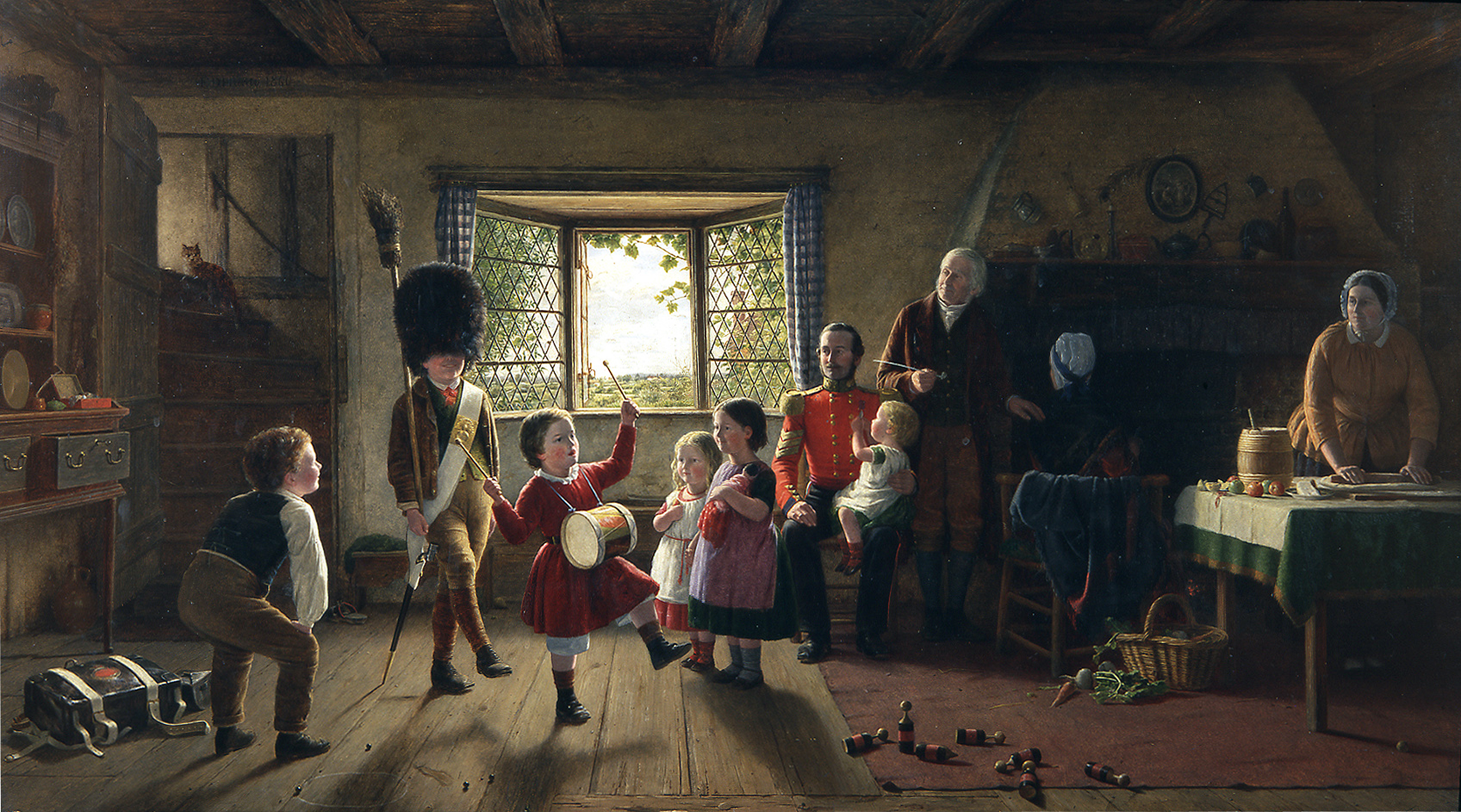
The Volunteers, 1860

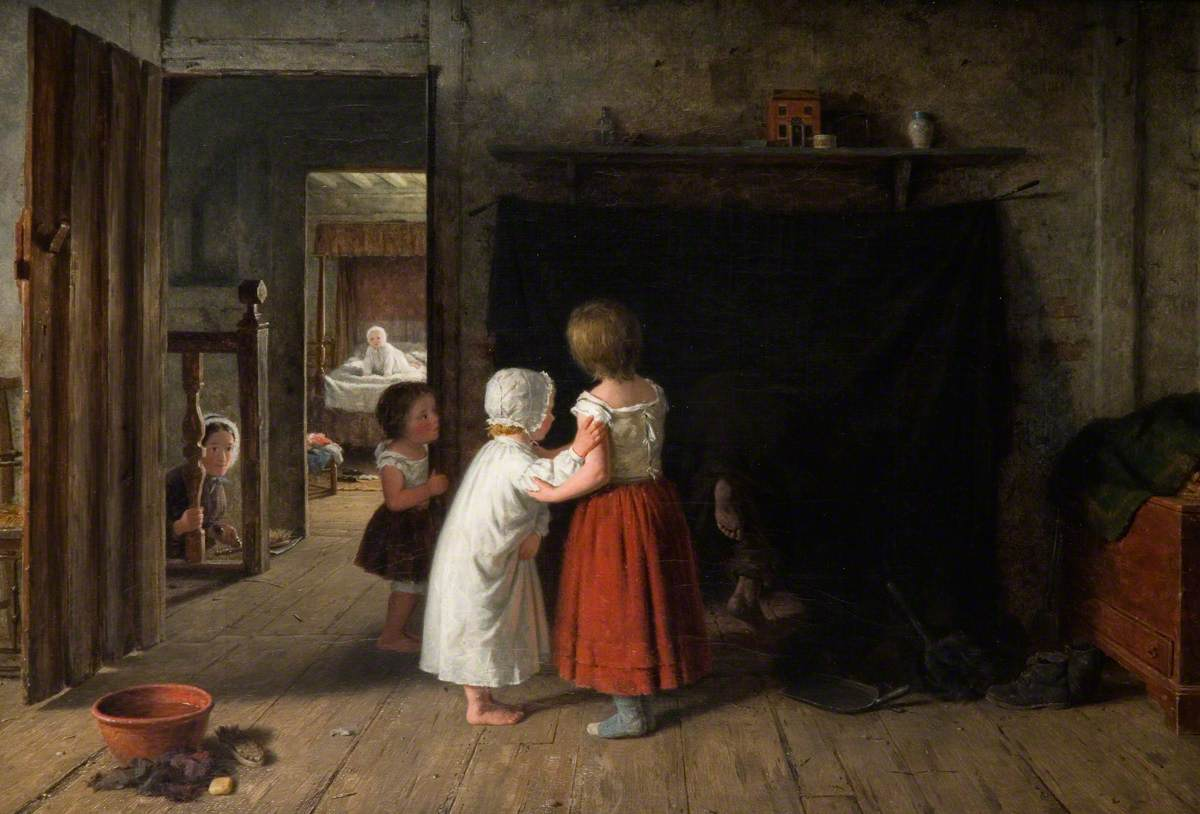
The Chimney Sweep, 1866

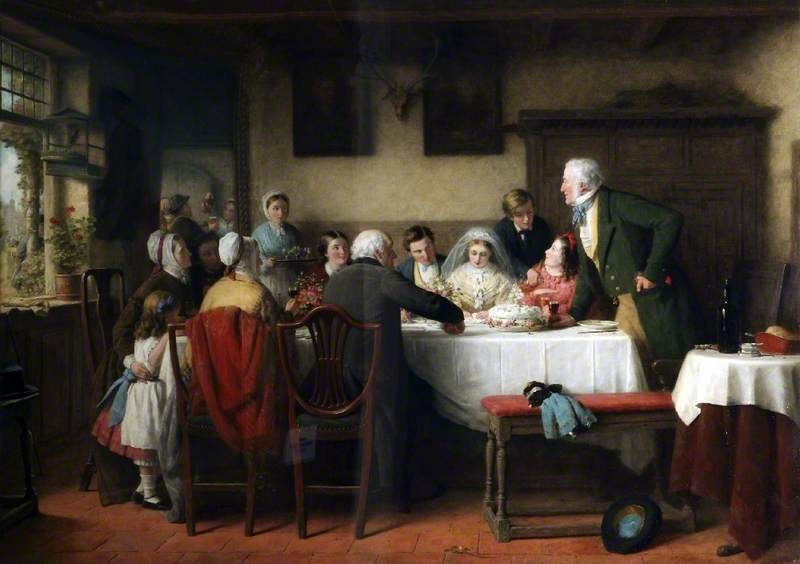
The Wedding Breakfast, 1871

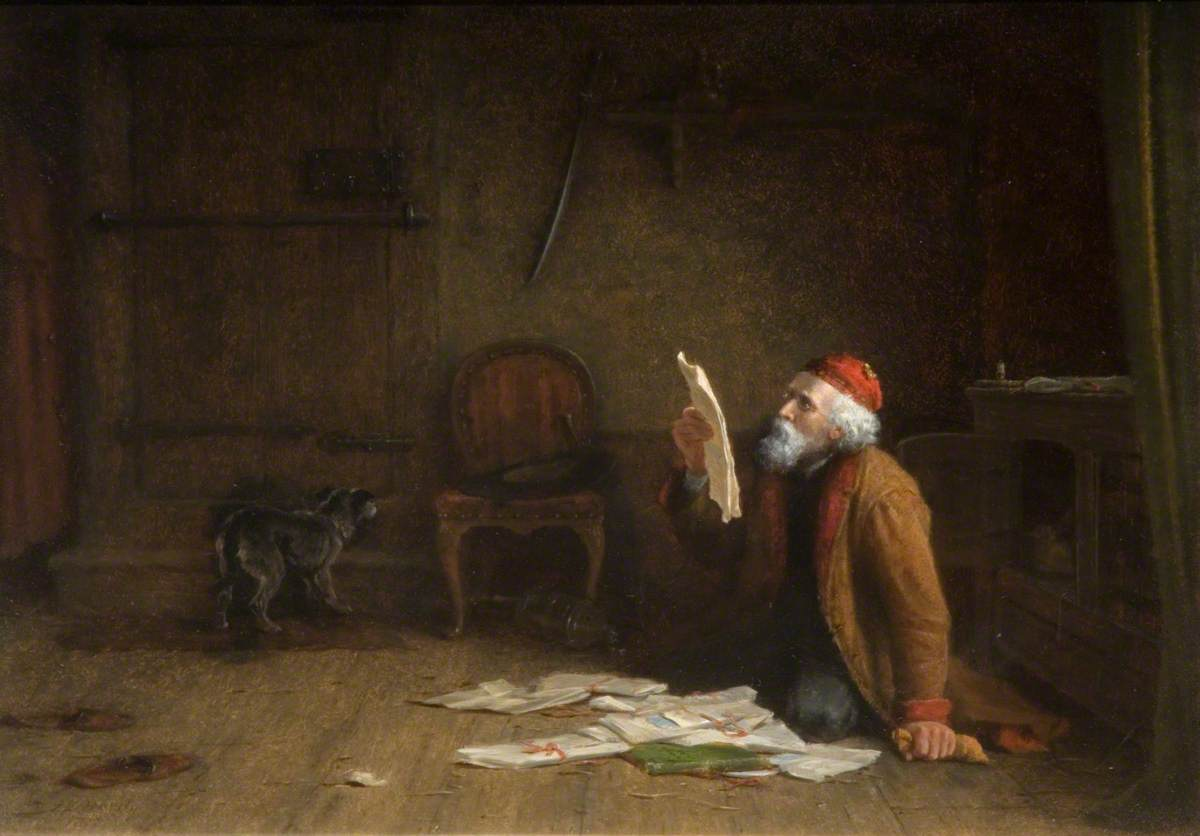
The Missing Deed, 1871

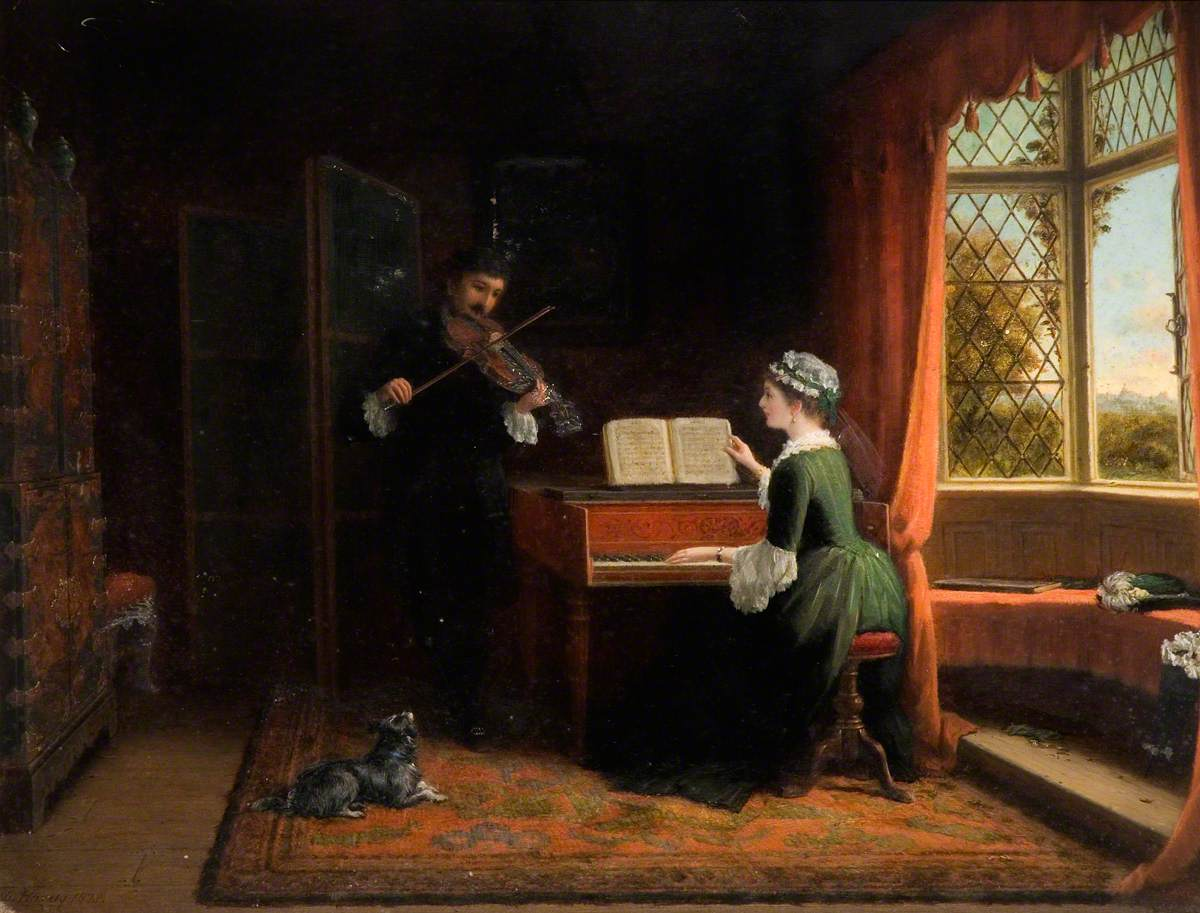
The Pelude, 1878

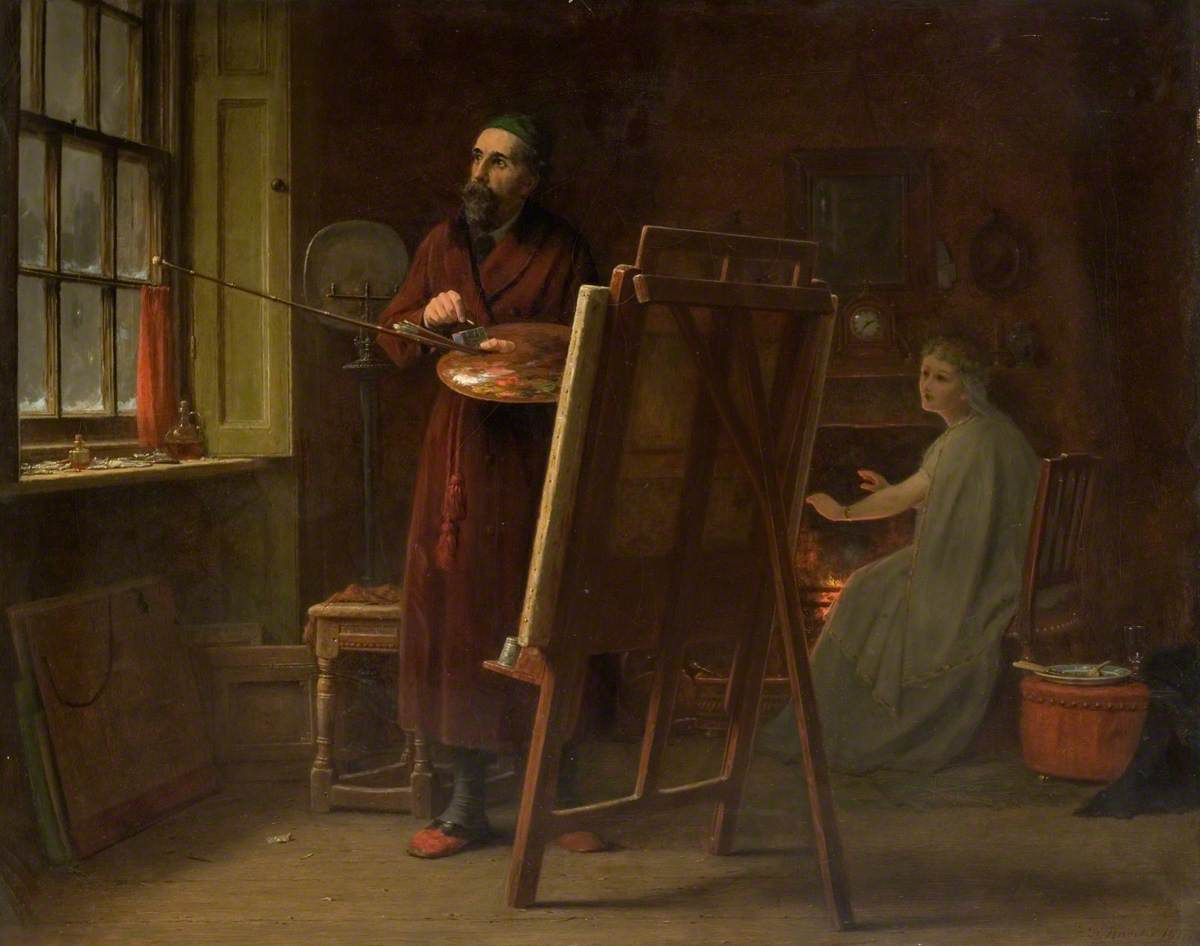
A Fog, 1887
