= A Pleasant Corner =

Painting by John Callcott Horsley

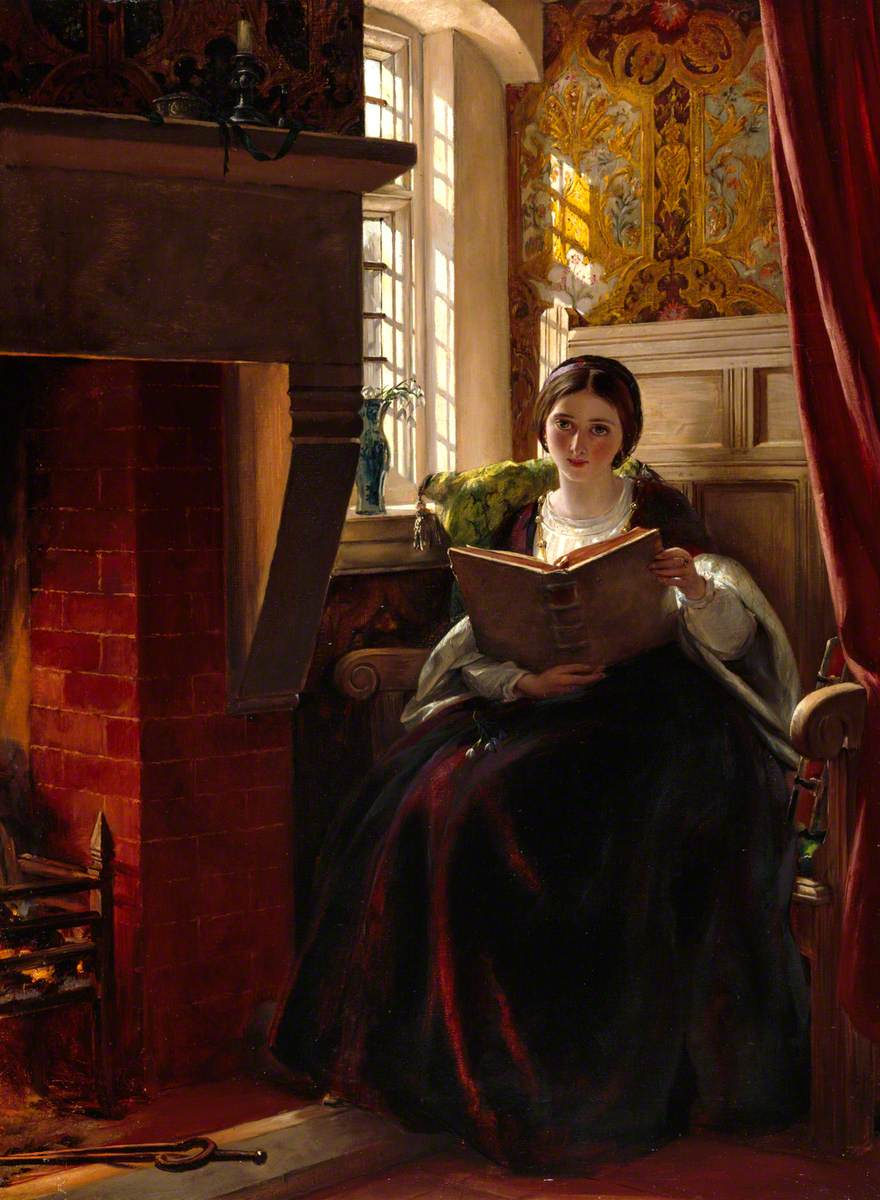
- Artist: John Callcott Horsley
- Year: 1865
- Type: Oil on canvas, genre painting
- Dimensions: 76.8 cm × 57.1 cm (30.2 in × 22.5 in)
- Location: Royal Academy, London

A Pleasant Corner is an 1865 oil painting by the British artist John Callcott Horsley. A genre painting, it shows a woman reading as bright winter sunlight pours through the window. The season is indicated by the snowdrops and the blazing fire in the fireplace.It depicts the inglenook of the dining room at the artist's own house at Willesley near Cranbrook in Kent, which was designed for him by the architect Richard Norman Shaw. Horsley was one of the artists who formed the Cranbrook Colony of painters.

Horsley was a well-known artist who had been the brother-in-law of the engineer Isambard Kingdom Brunel. When he was elected to full membership of the Royal Academy of Arts in 1865 he was required to provide a diploma work and chose to submit this. The painting was displayed at the Royal Academy Exhibition of 1866 held at the National Gallery in London. It remains in the Royal Academy's collection today. A smaller, replica version of painting by Horsley was auctioned by Christie's in 1997.

== Bibliography ==
- Badia, Janet & Phegley, Jennifer (ed.) Reading Women: Literary Figures and Cultural Icons from the Victorian Age to the Present. University of Toronto Press, 2005.
- Stewart, Garrett. The Look of Reading: Book, Painting, Text. University of Chicago Press, 2006.
