= The Bewitched Inn =

- Directed by: Georges Méliès
- Production company: Star Film Company
- Release date: 1897
- Running time: 2 min
- Country: France
- Language: Silent

The Bewitched Inn (French: L'auberge ensorcelée) is an 1897 French silent trick film directed by Georges Méliès. It was released by Méliès's Star Film Company and is numbered 122–123 in its catalogs.

== Plot ==
A traveler arrives in a small hotel room, complete with riding boots and a pith helmet. When he puts his luggage on the bed, it disappears immediately. Further magical confusions follow: when he sets down his helmet, it jumps to the floor and moves of its own accord before disappearing in its turn; when the traveler tries to light a candle, it jumps across the room and explodes; when he takes off his coat, it flies through the wall; when he tries to sit down, his chair changes place. Finally managing to sit down, the traveler takes off his boots, which walk away; when the traveler moves to the night table, it too disappears. The traveler prepares for bed and takes off his trousers, which fly through the ceiling. When he jumps into bed, it too disappears and reappears. The perplexed and irritated traveler gives up and exits the room.

== Themes ==
The Bewitched Inn is the first known Méliès film to feature inanimate objects coming to life to tease their owners, a theme that would return time and again throughout his work. The idea of a guest trying unsuccessfully to get to sleep in a hotel room, already popular for years on the variety stage, had been first used by Méliès in 1896, in his film A Terrible Night.

Méliès's 1903 film The Inn Where No Man Rests used a plot very similar to that of The Bewitched Inn, but expanded it considerably. The motif of a candle-laden traveler also returned in another 1903 Méliès film, The Apparition, or Mr. Jones' Comical Experience With a Ghost. The hotel guest theme reappeared again with further sophistication in Méliès's 1906 film A Roadside Inn.

== Production ==
The Bewitched Inn was likely inspired by the Hanlon-Lees, a British troupe of acrobats popular in Europe in the 1880s. The Hanlon-Lees, describing themselves as "Entortilationists", specialized in spectacular high-energy comedy acts in which they cavorted and bounced manically across the stage, often leaping through hidden trapdoors in the set. In one routine, a guest in a candlelit inn was first tormented by his shoes coming to life, and then chased around the stage by demons. Other Méliès films bearing the mark of the Hanlon-Lees' inspiration include The Inn Where No Man Rests and The Diabolic Tenant. Another inspiration for The Bewitched Inn probably came from a popular and influential 1839 féerie, Les Pilules du Diable, which included a scene in a haunted room.

The film was shot outdoors, in Méliès's garden in Montreuil, Seine-Saint-Denis. The inanimate objects were animated using wires; other special effects were created using pyrotechnics and the editing technique known as the substitution splice, which allowed the magical disappearances to occur. Méliès himself played the traveler.
