= The Volunteers (painting) =

Painting by Frederick Daniel Hardy

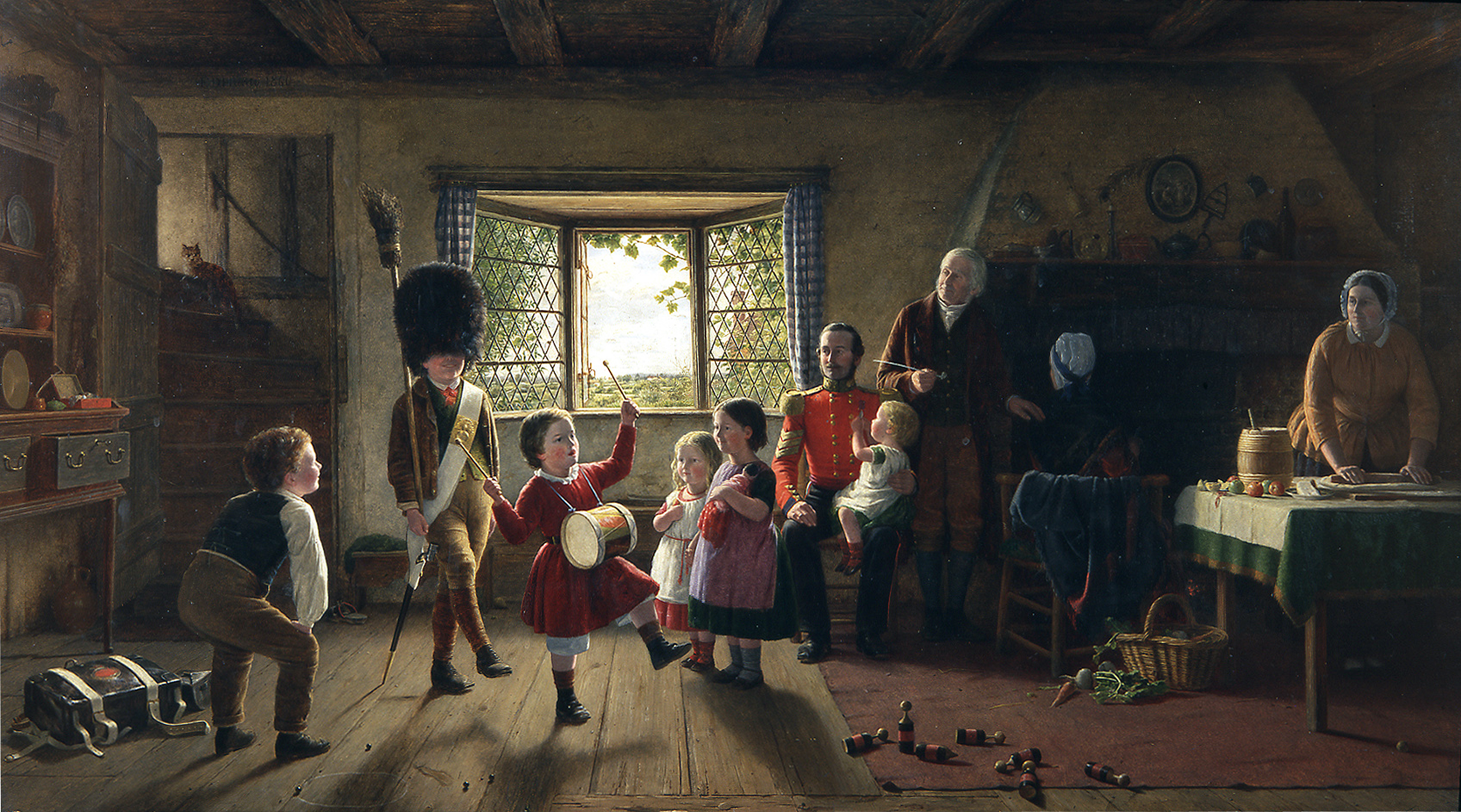
- Artist: Frederick Daniel Hardy
- Year: 1860
- Type: Oil on panel, genre painting
- Dimensions: 62.5 cm × 111 cm (24.6 in × 44 in)
- Location: York Art Gallery, Yorkshire

The Volunteers is an 1860 oil painting by the British artist Frederick Daniel Hardy. A genre painting it shows a scene in a rural English cottage as a group of children play soldiers. Unusually for Hardy's scenes of everyday life it includes a father figure (whose appearance somewhat resembles Prince Albert) dressed in the uniform of the British Army.

Hardy was a leading figure in the Cranbrook Colony of artists who specialised in scenes of everyday Victorian life. The painting was displayed at the Royal Academy Exhibition of 1860 held at the National Gallery in London. Today it is part of the collection at the York Art Gallery which acquired it in 1882.

== Bibliography ==
- Broughton, Trev Lynn. Gender and Fatherhood in the Nineteenth Century. Bloomsbury Publishing, 2017.
- Hichberger J.W.M. Images of the Army: The Military in British Art, 1815-1914. Manchester University Press, 2017.
- Thompson, Carol (ed.) The Cranbrook Colony: Fresh Perspectives. Wolverhampton Art Gallery, 2010.
