= William Henry Knight =

English painter

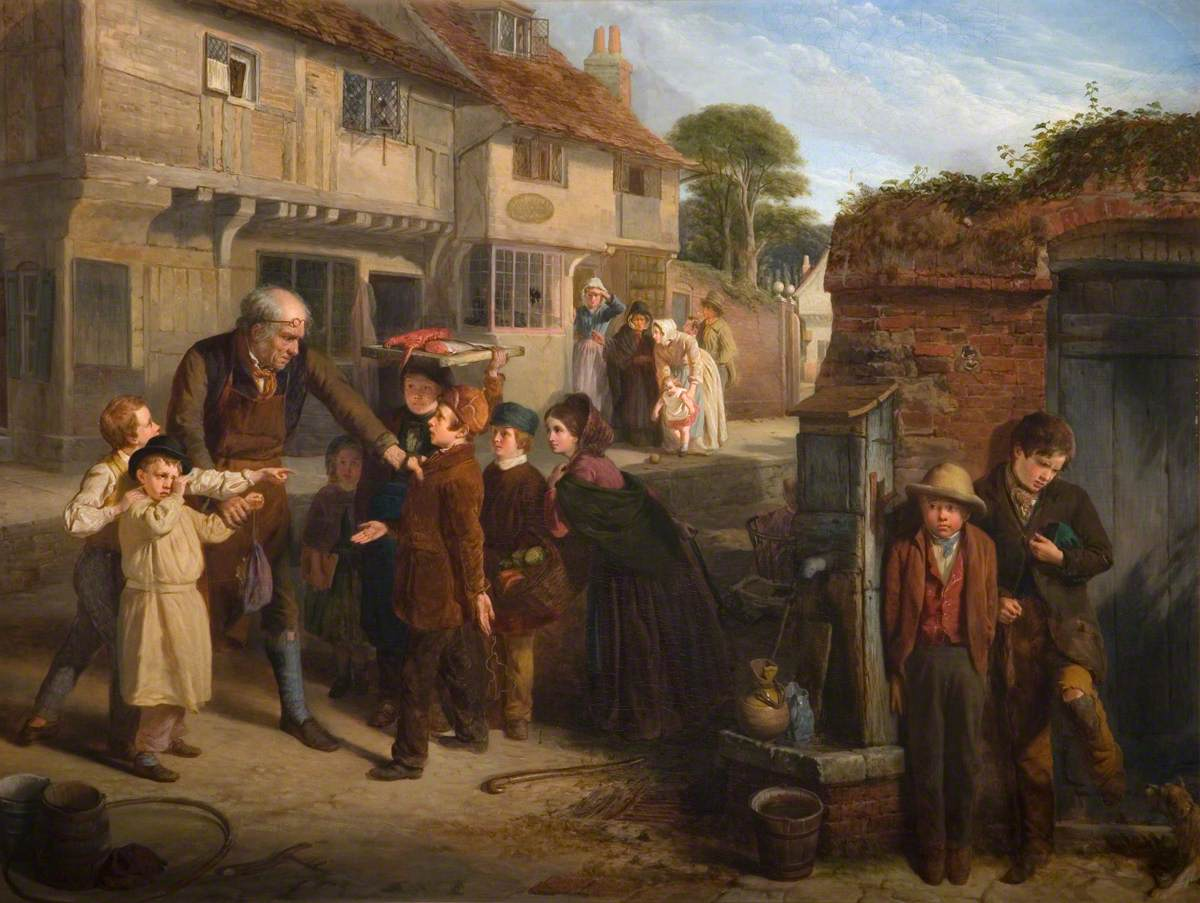
"The Broken Window" (1855)

William Henry Knight (26 September 1823 – 31 July 1863) was an English portrait and genre painter.

== Life and work ==
Knight was born in Newbury, Berkshire where his father, John Knight, was a schoolmaster. He was to become a solicitor, but gave up his law studies after two of his paintings were accepted by the annual exhibition of the Society of British Artists. He moved to London in 1855, taking lodgings in Kennington Road, Lambeth, and supporting himself by drawing crayon portraits while studying in the British Museum and at the Royal Academy Schools.

Following in the footsteps of William Mulready, he became a genre painter, his street scenes and interior scenes often showing children at play. His first contribution to the Royal Academy exhibition was Boys playing draughts in 1846; from that year until 1862 he was a constant exhibitor there. He also showed many pictures at the British Institution.

Among his best works were: "A Christmas party preparing for blind man's buff" (1850); "Time for play", "Boys snowballing" (1853); "The broken window" (1855 – engraved for the August 1865 issue of The Art Journal); "The village school" (1857); "Knuckle down" (1858); "The lost change" (1859); Hide and seek (1860); The game of marbles, "An unexpected trump" (1861); "Rivals to Blondin" and "The counterfeit coin" (1862). Many engravings were made from his works. In his 1855 Academy notes, John Ruskin wrote about The broken window: "This picture does not catch the eye at a distance, but, on looking close, there will be found exquisite and careful painting in it."

Knight died on 31 July 1863 aged 39, leaving a widow and six children.

== Bibliography ==
- Cowling, Mary (2000), Victorian Figurative Painting: Domestic Life and the Contemporary Social Scene, London: Papadakis, ISBN 1-901092-32-1.
- Ruskin, John (1855), Notes on Some of the Principal Pictures Exhibited in the Rooms of the Royal Academy, London: Smith, Elder.
