= The Chimney Sweep (painting) =

Painting by Frederick Daniel Hardy

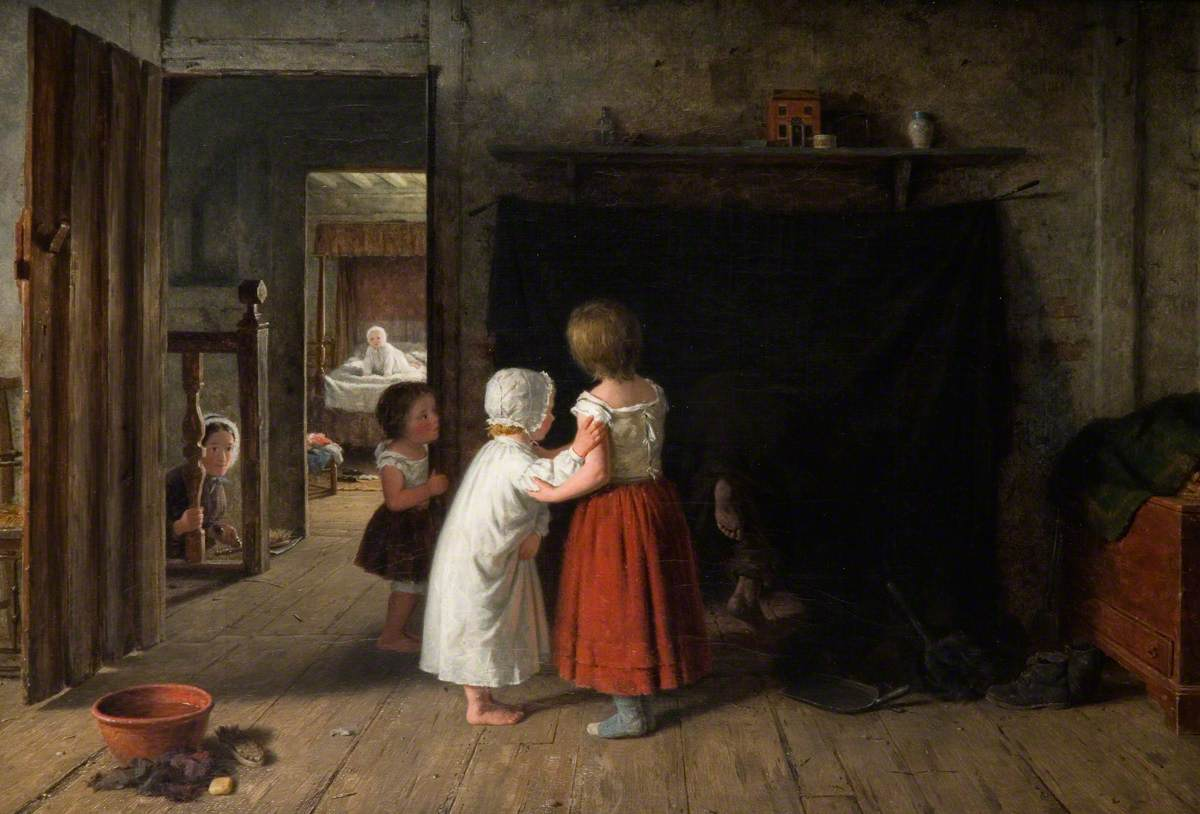
- Version in Wolverhampton Art Gallery
- Artist: Frederick Daniel Hardy
- Year: 1866
- Type: Oil on panel, genre painting
- Dimensions: 35.5 cm × 51.5 cm (14.0 in × 20.3 in)
- Location: Wolverhampton Art Gallery, Wolverhampton

The Chimney Sweep is an 1866 oil painting by the British artist Frederick Daniel Hardy. A genre painting it shows a chimney sweep at work up a chimney, with only his shoes visible a young children watch with slight alarm and amazement. It was inspired by an event in Hardy's own household. To maintain the cosy atmosphere of the painting and avoid the topic of child labour the feet of the sweep are clearly an adults.

Hardy was a prominent member of the Cranbrook Colony of artists who specialised in scenes of everyday life during the mid-Victorian era. Several versions of the painting exist including an original which was displayed at the Royal Academy Exhibition of 1862 at the National Gallery in London where it was reviewed in The Art Journal. Demonstrating his popularity at the time it sold £200 in 1862 and then again for £640 in 1874. A notable version dates from 1866 and is in the collection of the Wolverhampton Art Gallery, which acquired through the widow of the toy manufacturer Sidney Cartwright, a major collector of Cranbrook artists in 1887. It hangs at nearby Bantock House.

== Bibliography ==
- Roe, Sonia & Ellis, Andrew. Oil Paintings in Public Ownership in Staffordshire. Public Catalogue Foundation, 2007.
- Thompson, Carol (ed.) The Cranbrook Colony: Fresh Perspectives. Wolverhampton Art Gallery, 2010.
