= The Chimney Sweep (film) =

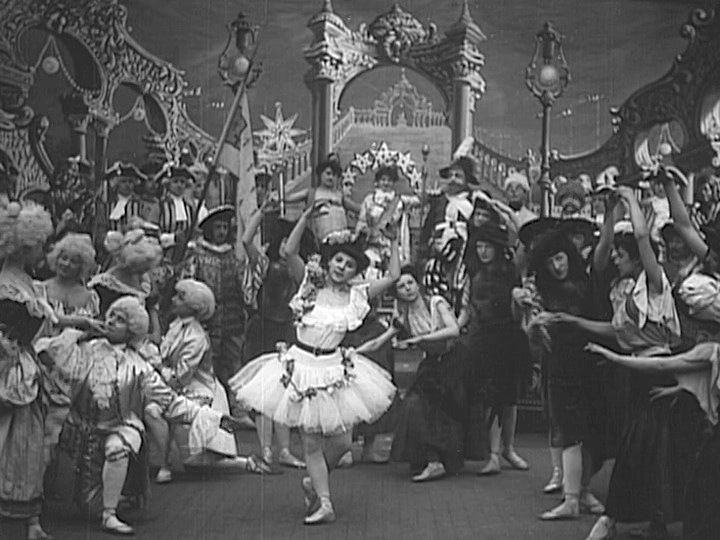
- A scene from the film
- Directed by: Georges Méliès
- Production company: Star Film Company
- Release date: March 1906
- Running time: 320 meters; 16 minutes
- Country: France
- Language: Silent

The Chimney Sweep (French: Jack le ramoneur) (Note: The film was first advertised in Méliès's American catalogs as Chimney Sweep, without the initial article.) is a 1906 French silent film directed by Georges Méliès.

== Plot ==
Surviving fragment of the film

Jack, a kidnapped boy working as a chimney sweep, is roughly treated and often beaten by his brutal employer. Falling asleep after a long day, he dreams of his lost mother and the fairy tales he heard. The memories transform into a journey through Dream Country, led by the Fairy of Dreams, who turns Jack into a King amid the celebrations of a royal court. The dream ends abruptly when Jack is woken up by his employer for the day's work.

Jack is busily at work when, behind some bricks inside a chimney, he comes across a box full of gold and money, hidden there many years ago. The employer tries to take possession of the treasure trove, but Jack runs away. A chase ensues through the neighborhood, with townspeople and servants joining in. Jack escapes and hides just before his employer falls into a pit. Finding him covered with mud, the onlookers plunge him into a cask of water.

By good luck, Jack manages to come across his family, and is welcomed back. Surrounded by riches, he forgives his former employer. (Note: Since only a fragment of the film survives, this plot summary is based on the synopsis offered in Méliès's American catalog. See Méliès 1905, pp. 93–98.)

== Production ==
From 1905 onward, films by the Pathé Frères studios gained sweeping popularity at fairground cinemas and other venues. Méliès attempted to respond to this popularity by imitating their style. Thus, The Chimney Sweep is a bricolage, combining Méliès's sense of fantasy with the dramatic, realist tone of popular Pathé films, possibly with a young audience in mind. The chase at the end of the film also suggests Méliès's attempts to keep up with the times, as chase films had become a popular trend. (Note: A publication on Méliès's films by the Centre national du cinéma cites this film in a discussion of the wide scope of Méliès's filmmaking at the beginning of 1906: A Chimney Sweep was immediately preceded by the broad comedy A Mix-up in the Gallery, and was followed by the realist drama A Desperate Crime.)

Méliès appears in the film as one of two men who join the chase scene together; Emile Gajean is the other. The ballet in the film is performed by the corps de ballet of the Théâtre du Châtelet, and was choreographed by Madame Stitchel, their director. Stitchel also choreographed dances for other Méliès films, including Under the Seas. The Ping-Pongs, an English company of dancing girls, played the Troops of Dream Country. Unusually for Méliès, the chase scenes were filmed outdoors: each of these exterior scenes was staged on a different part of Méliès's own property in Montreuil, Seine-Saint-Denis. Special effects in the film were created using stage machinery, substitution splices, superimpositions, and dissolves.

== Release ==
The film was released by Méliès's Star Film Company and is numbered 791–806 in its catalogs. In French catalogs, it was advertised as a conte bleu fantastique en 25 tableaux; in English-language catalogs, as "an extravagant 'cock and bull' story in 25 scenes." The English-language catalog writeup for the film also highlighted its comic chase scene, saying that The Chimney Sweep included "Comedy—Mystery—Sensational Adventures—Pathos—Acrobatics—Spectacular Effects and A GREAT BIG CHASE." The film was registered for copyright at the Library of Congress on 17 February 1906, and showings of it were first advertised in the Phono-Ciné-Gazette on 1 March of the same year. It was offered to exhibitors in both black-and-white and (for a higher price) hand-colored prints.

A fragment of the film survives; the rest is presumed lost.

== Notes ==
=== Citations ===
- Abel, Richard (1998), The Ciné Goes to Town: French Cinema, 1896–1914, Berkeley: University of California Press, ISBN 9780520912915
- Essai de reconstitution du catalogue français de la Star-Film; suivi d'une analyse catalographique des films de Georges Méliès recensés en France, Bois d'Arcy: Service des archives du film du Centre national de la cinématographie, 1981, ISBN 2903053073
- Hammond, Paul (1974), Marvellous Méliès, London: Gordon Fraser, ISBN 0900406380
- Malthête, Jacques; Mannoni, Laurent (2008), L'oeuvre de Georges Méliès, Paris: Éditions de La Martinière, ISBN 9782732437323
- Méliès, Georges (1905), Complete Catalogue of Genuine and Original "Star" Films, New York: Geo. Méliès, doi:10.7282/T3CR5TJ3
