= A Roadside Inn =

Short silent film by Georges Méliès

- Directed by: Georges Méliès
- Starring: Georges Méliès
- Production company: Star Film Company
- Release date: 1906
- Country: France
- Language: Silent

A Roadside Inn (French: L'Hôtel des voyageurs de commerce ou les Suites d'une bonne cuite, literally "The Hotel for Traveling Salesmen, or the Results of Being Very Drunk") is a 1906 French silent trick film by Georges Méliès. It was sold by Méliès's Star Film Company and is numbered 843–845 in its catalogues.

Méliès plays the drunk hotel guest in the film, which uses stage machinery, pyrotechnics, and substitution splices for its effects. The distinctive film set, divided in two parts to show two rooms, is similar to one Méliès employed in his later film Tunneling the English Channel (1907).
