= A Desperate Crime =

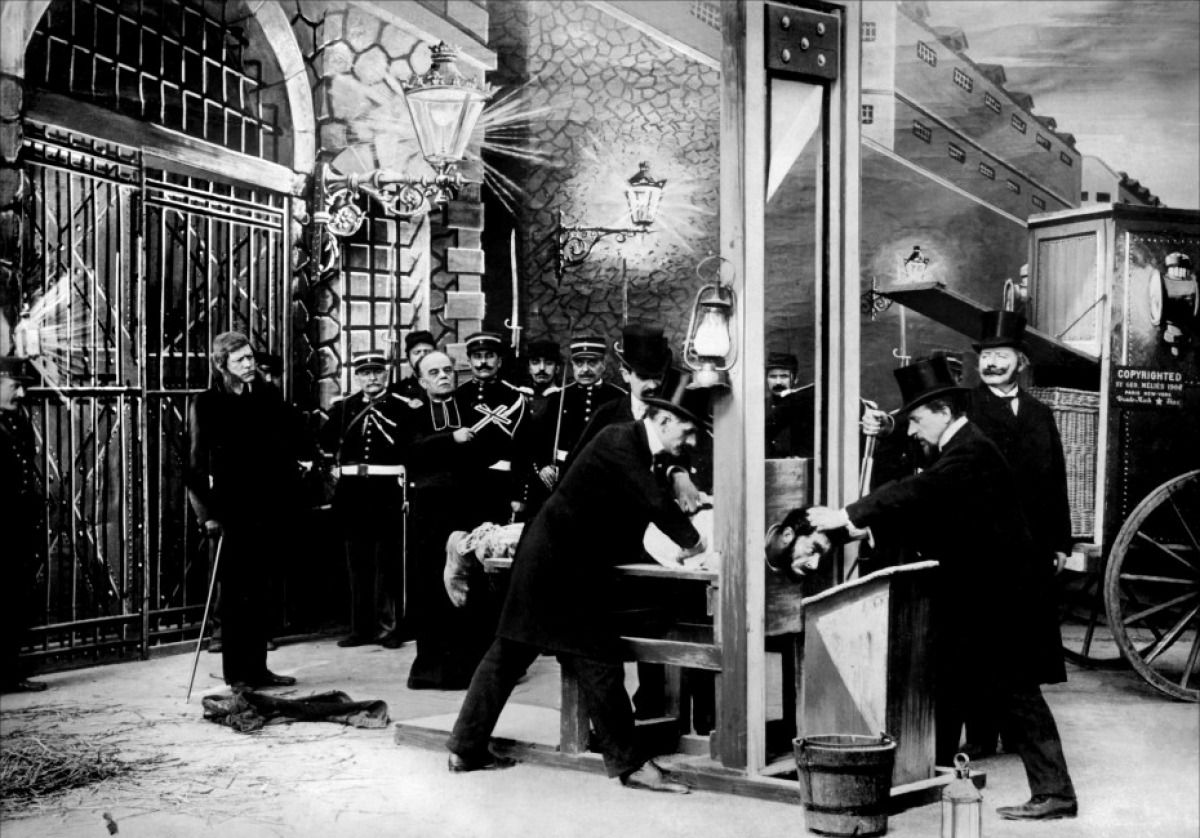
- The execution at the film's climax
- Directed by: Georges Méliès
- Written by: Gaston Méliès
- Produced by: Georges Méliès
- Starring: Manuel
- Production company: Star Film Company
- Release date: 1906
- Running time: 307 meters/1000 feet; 15 minutes
- Country: France
- Language: Silent

A Desperate Crime (French: Les Incendiaires), also known as Histoire d'un crime, is a 1906 French silent film directed by Georges Méliès.

== Plot ==
Surviving footage from A Desperate Crime

As night falls on a farmyard in the French countryside, four masked bandits climb over the gate and break into the farmhouse. They bind and gag the farmer and his wife, and stab a male and female servant who attempt to help their masters. In an attempt to get the farmer to divulge where he has his money hidden, the bandits burn his feet with embers from the fireplace, but the farmer remains silent. When the bandits threaten to do the same to the farmer's young daughter, the farmer's wife gives in and reveals the money's hiding place. The bandits gather the money; just as they are attempting to flee, the farmer's wife tears off the bandit chief's mask, revealing his face. In retaliation for the unmasking, the bandit chief sets the house on fire, and the bandits escape in the confusion.

The bandits return to their hideout in an abandoned quarry, warning the rest of their gang that policemen are on their track. The police soon break into the hideout, and a large fight ensues. The bandit chief escapes with the few gang members who have survived of the fight, with the surviving policemen in pursuit. The bandits flee through the quarry into the mountains. The chief is finally ambushed by hiding policemen, captured, and put on trial. The farmer's wife, the only survivor of the fire in the farmhouse, identifies the bandit, and he is sentenced to death. The bandit chief, after a night tormented by dreams of his crimes, is led to the guillotine, executed, and thrown into an unmarked grave.

== Production ==
Méliès's greatest financial successes had occurred in 1903 and 1904; by 1906, his fortunes had begun to decline as competition with other firms, such as Pathé Frères and Gaumont, became more intense. In an attempt to keep financially afloat, Méliès expanded from his usual fantasy style to try making films in the genres his competitors had made popular, including the melodramas A Desperate Crime and The Christmas Angel and the chase film The Chimney Sweep.

According to the 1944 recollections of Georges Méliès's nephew Paul, the scenario for A Desperate Crime was written by Gaston Méliès (Georges's brother and Paul's father). Méliès's American catalogue claimed that the crime in the film was based on a real-life incident. The film is heavily indebted to Histoire d'un crime, a 1901 film by Méliès's competitor Ferdinand Zecca; the plot closely follows the events of the earlier film, differing only in the details of the crime itself. On the other hand, Méliès's film is stylistically very different from Zecca's, which uses a faster pace and a more stringent insistence on journalistic realism.

The actor Manuel, who directed some films for the Méliès studio in 1908, plays the main role of the bandit who is arrested and executed. Georges Méliès probably plays the executioner's assistant. In a highly unusual move for Méliès, many of the scenes were shot outdoors on location, outside of Méliès's property in Montreuil, Seine-Saint-Denis; as far as is known, the only other occasions Méliès filmed outside his property were for some of the actuality films he made between 1896 and 1900. One scene was filmed in a disused quarry in Montreuil. Despite the film's unusual subject for Méliès, it features several of the special effects techniques he had famously used in his fantasy films, including substitution splices, multiple exposures, dissolves, and pyrotechnic effects.

== Release and survival ==
The film was released by Méliès's Star Film Company and is numbered 824–837 in its catalogues, where it was advertised as a grand drame réaliste en 22 tableaux. As with at least 4% of Méliès's output, some prints were individually hand-colored and sold at a higher price. The two final scenes, showing the execution, were specified as optional in France, for fear their realism would frighten the audience. Unusually for Méliès, special publicity artwork was commissioned to advertise the film at American showings: three lithographs by the Donaldson Lithographing Company, and a half-sheet poster by Hennegan and Company. (The founders of these companies, William Donaldson and James Hennegan, are now better known as the founding editors of Billboard magazine.)

A fragment of the film survives; the rest is presumed lost.
