= Edmund Bristow =

English painter

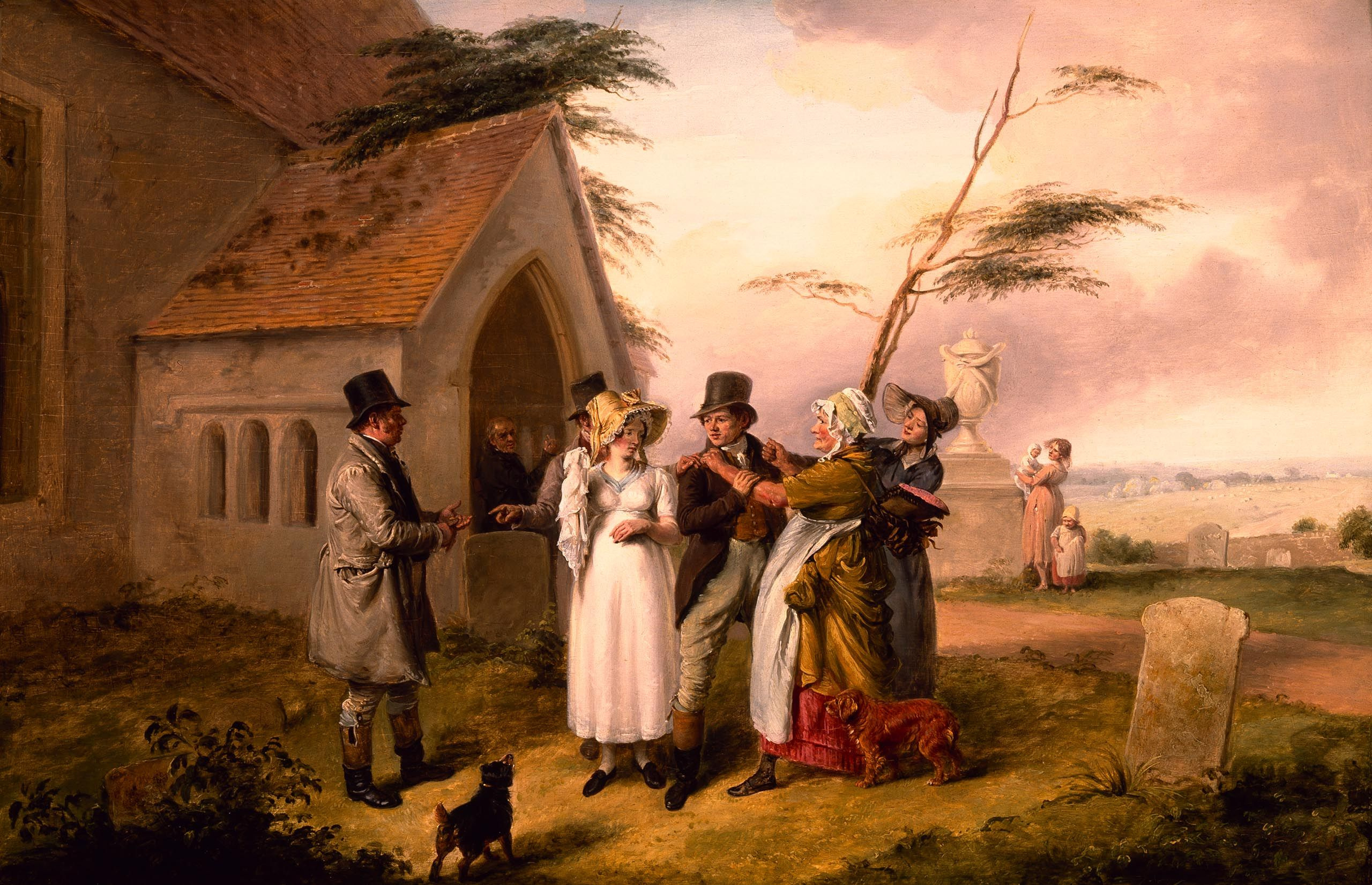
The Interrupted Wedding, now in the Berger Collection at the Denver Art Museum.

Edmund Bristow (1 Apr 1787 – 12 Feb 1876) was an English animal, still life and subject painter.

== Life and work ==
Bristow was born in Eton, Berkshire, the son of an heraldic painter. At an early age he was patronised by the Princess Elizabeth, the Duke of Clarence (afterwards William IV), and others. He made sketches of well-known characters in Eton and Windsor, painted still life, interiors, and domestic and sporting subjects. He had great sympathy with animals, some power of rendering their characteristic movements and expressions, and is said to have been a friend of and given advice to Sir Edwin Landseer.

In 1809 he exhibited a painting, "Smith shoeing a Horse", at the Royal Academy, and was an occasional exhibitor there and at the British Institution, and Society of British Artists, until the year 1838, when he exhibited the "Donkey Race" at the latter's gallery in Suffolk Street.

Bristowe was an eccentric man of independent spirit and worked only when the spirit moved him – not to order. He sometimes refused even to sell his finished works. He excelled in the drawing of monkeys, cats, and horses. His works tended to be small in scale, well observed and with great attention to detail. Many of his works were bought by private collectors in the local area. Amongst his paintings may be mentioned: 'Monkey Pugilists,' 'Cat's Paw,' 'Law and Justice,' 'Incredulity,' 'The Rehearsal,' 'Pros and Cons of Life.' Engravings of a few of his works appeared in The Sporting Magazine and elsewhere.

Bristow produced little during the fifteen years immediately preceding his death, which took place at Eton on 12 February 1876, at the age of 89.
