= Martin Henry Colnaghi =

English art dealer

Martin Henry Colnaghi (16 November 1821 – 27 June 1908) was an independent British art dealer.

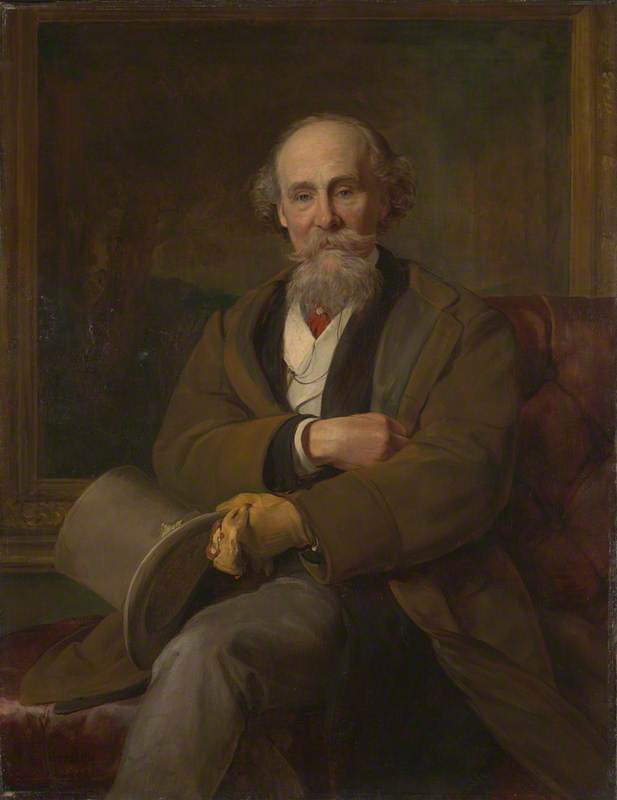
Portrait of Martin Colnaghi by John Callcott Horsley, 1889

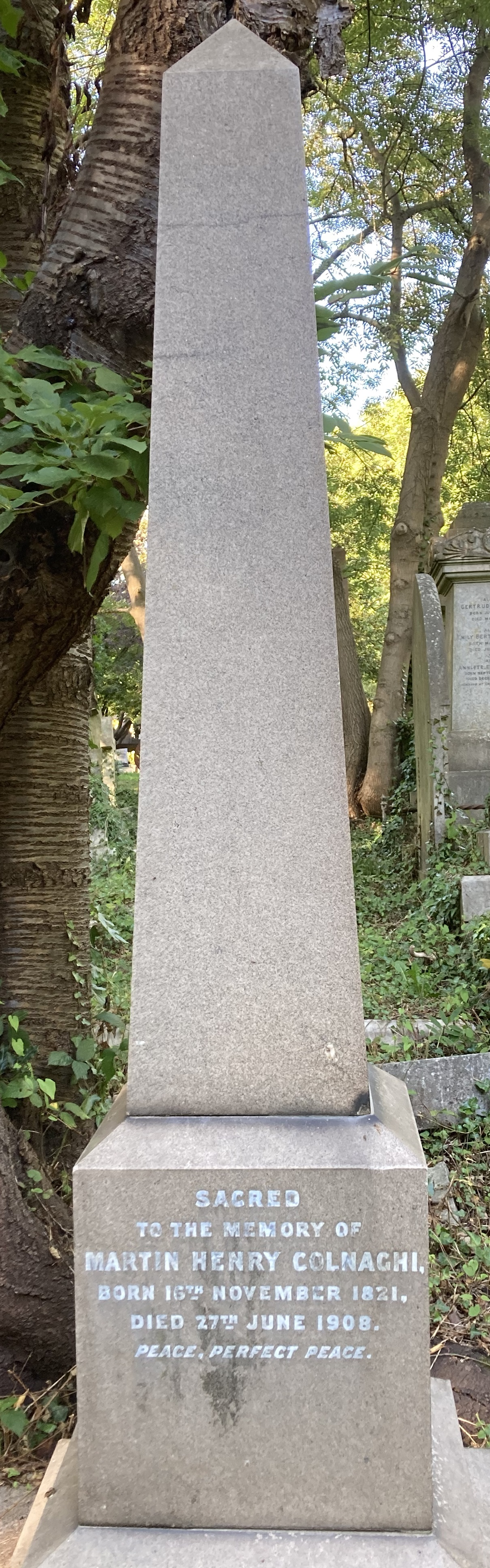
Grave of Martin Henry Colnaghi in Highgate Cemetery

== Personal life ==
He was born on 16 November 1821 at 23 Cockspur Street, London, and baptised Martino Enrico Luigi Gaetano. He was the eldest son of Martin Colnaghi and his wife, Fanny Boyce Clarke, and a grandson of Paul Colnaghi of Pall Mall.

Colnaghi had three marriages, but no children.

1. Sarah Nash
2. Elizabeth Maxwell Howard (died 1888)
3. On 17 October 1889, he married Amy Mary Smith, daughter of the artist George Smith

Colnaghi died on 27 June 1908, aged 86, at the Marlborough Gallery, and was buried on the eastern side of Highgate Cemetery.

== Antique Dealer ==
Martin Colnaghi was a picture dealer and art collector with a keen interest in old master paintings, especially Dutch and Flemish pictures. A more detailed biography can be seen here.

== Legacy ==
Colnaghi bequeathed four paintings to London's National Gallery: Lorenzo Lotto's Madonna and Child and Saints, Philips Wouwerman's Two Horseman at a Gypsy Encampment (previously titled The Bohemians), Aert van der Neer's Landscape with a River at Evening( previously titled Dawn, and Thomas Gainsborough's The Bridge now held by the Tate (previously exhibited and titled Landscape at the Royal Academy 1892 Exhibition by Mrs Martin Colnaghi, page 6). He stipulated that after his wife's death, £80,000 should go to the National Gallery, to buy art, to form the Martin Colnaghi bequest. In addition, in 1908, his late wife Amy, bequeathed the portrait of her husband, painted by John Callcott Horsley to the National Gallery. After Amy's death in 1940 the remains of his collection were sold by auction at the Willis's Rooms (earlier known as Almack's) by Robinson and Foster Ltd on 22 and 23 January 1941.
