= Book of Common Prayer (1843 illustrated version) =

American Episcopal prayer book

The Illustrated Book of Common Prayer
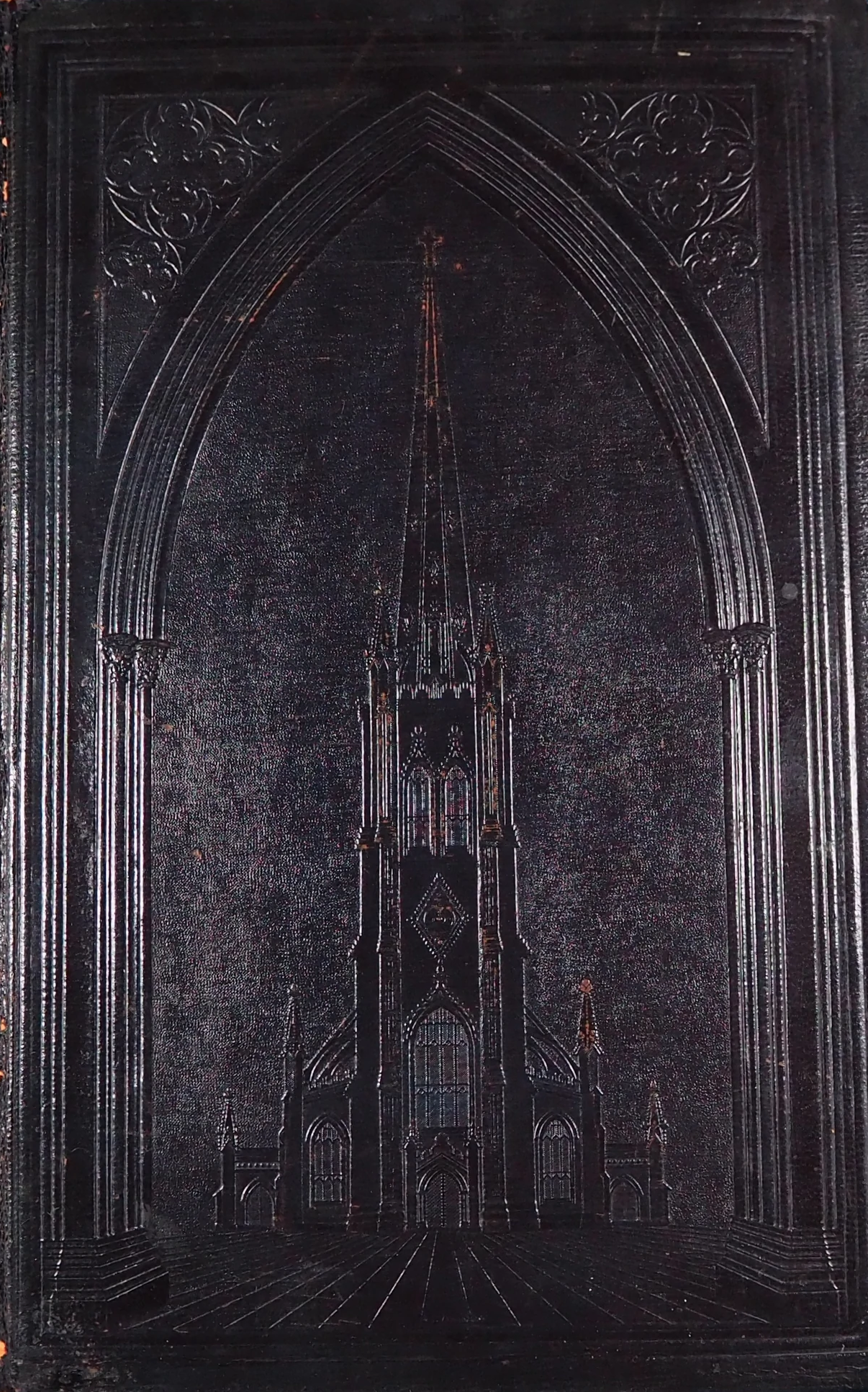
- The Prayer Book's leather cover featuring an embossed image of the Trinity Church in Lower Manhattan, New York City.
- Editor: Thomas Cranmer; J. M. Wainwright
- Illustrator: Richard Westall, John Chapman et al.
- Language: English
- Subject: Anglican devotions Anglican liturgy Anglican sacraments Anglican theology
- Genre: Liturgical book Prayer book
- Publisher: H. W. Hewet
- Publication date: 1843
- Publication place: United States
- Media type: Print (leatherbound)
- Pages: 801 pp. (XXV+671+105)
- OCLC: 31452987

The 1843 illustrated Book of Common Prayer (full title: The Illustrated Book of Common Prayer) is an illustrated version of the 1790 edition Book of Common Prayer, the then-official primary liturgical book of the American Episcopal Church, edited by the Rev. J. M. Wainwright, printed and published by H. W. Hewet, a New York-based engraver and publisher, and certified by Bishop Benjamin T. Onderdonk on December 18th, 1843.

== Full name ==
The full name of the 1843 illustrated Book of Common Prayer is The Book of Common Prayer, and Administration of the Sacraments; and other Rites and Ceremonies of the Church, according to the use of the Protestant Episcopal Church in the United States of America. Together with the Psalter, or Psalms of David.

== Overview ==
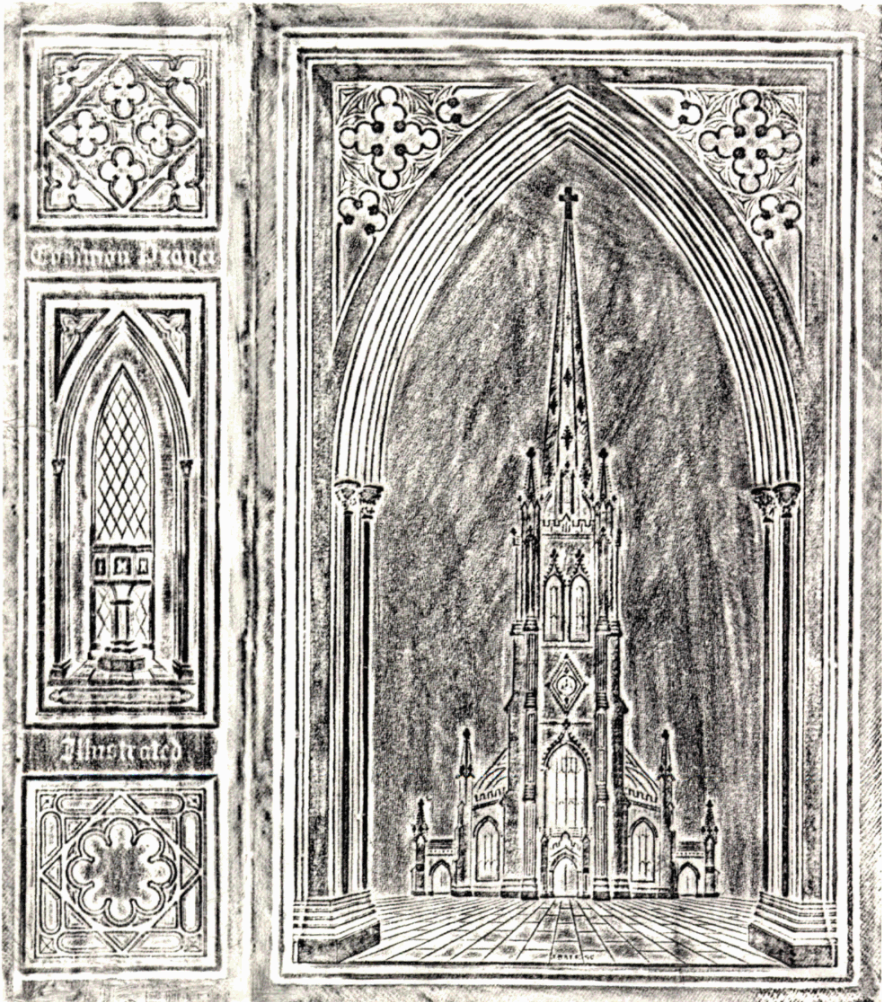
The design of cover and spine.

Hewet's edition of the Prayer Book is bound in black morocco leather, the cover features an embossed image of the Trinity Church in Lower Manhattan, New York City.

The book contains numerous engravings of works by Da Vinci, Dürer, Overbeck, Poussin, Rembrandt, Rubens, Tintoretto and others serving as illustrations for historical subjects, as well as historiated and inhabited initials. Chapter title pages and openers are decorated with illustrations of, mostly, British cathedrals and churches, either exterior or interior, set in architectural borders and niches. Richard Westall's illustrations for the sacraments are mostly set in an Elizabethan setting.

This illustrated edition was the basis of the 1845 Standard Edition of the 1790 prayer book, upon which the Standard Edition of 1845 was prepared and corrected.

== See also ==
- Book of Common Prayer (1662)
- Book of Common Prayer (1845 illuminated version)
- Episcopal Diocese of New York
