= Portrait of Martin Colnaghi =

Painting by John Callcott Horsley

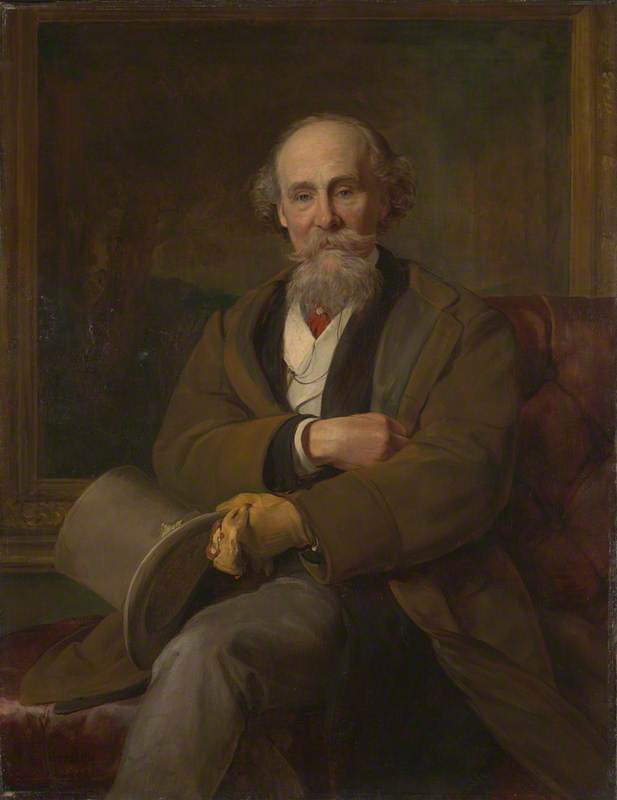
- Artist: John Callcott Horsley
- Year: 1889
- Type: Oil on canvas, portrait painting
- Dimensions: 111.8 cm × 87 cm (44.0 in × 34 in)
- Location: National Gallery, London

Portrait of Martin Colnaghi is an 1889 portrait painting by the British artist John Callcott Horsley. It depicts the art dealer and art collector Martin Henry Colnaghi, known in particular for his interest in Old Masters. Callcott Horsley was a prominent British artist and member of the Royal Academy, who had been brother-in-law to Isambard Kingdom Brunel. The painting was displayed at the Royal Academy Exhibition of 1889 held at Burlington House in London. It was given to the National Gallery by his widow Amy Colnaghi in 1908. Colnaghi had been a major benefactor of the National Gallery, presenting it with five paintings and £75,000 that allowed it to acquire thirteen more.

== Bibliography ==
- Lucas, Edward Verrall. The British School: An Anecdotal Guide to the British Painters and Paintings in the National Gallery. Methuen & Company, 1913.
