= The World Forgetting, By the World Forgot =

Painting by John Callcott Horsley

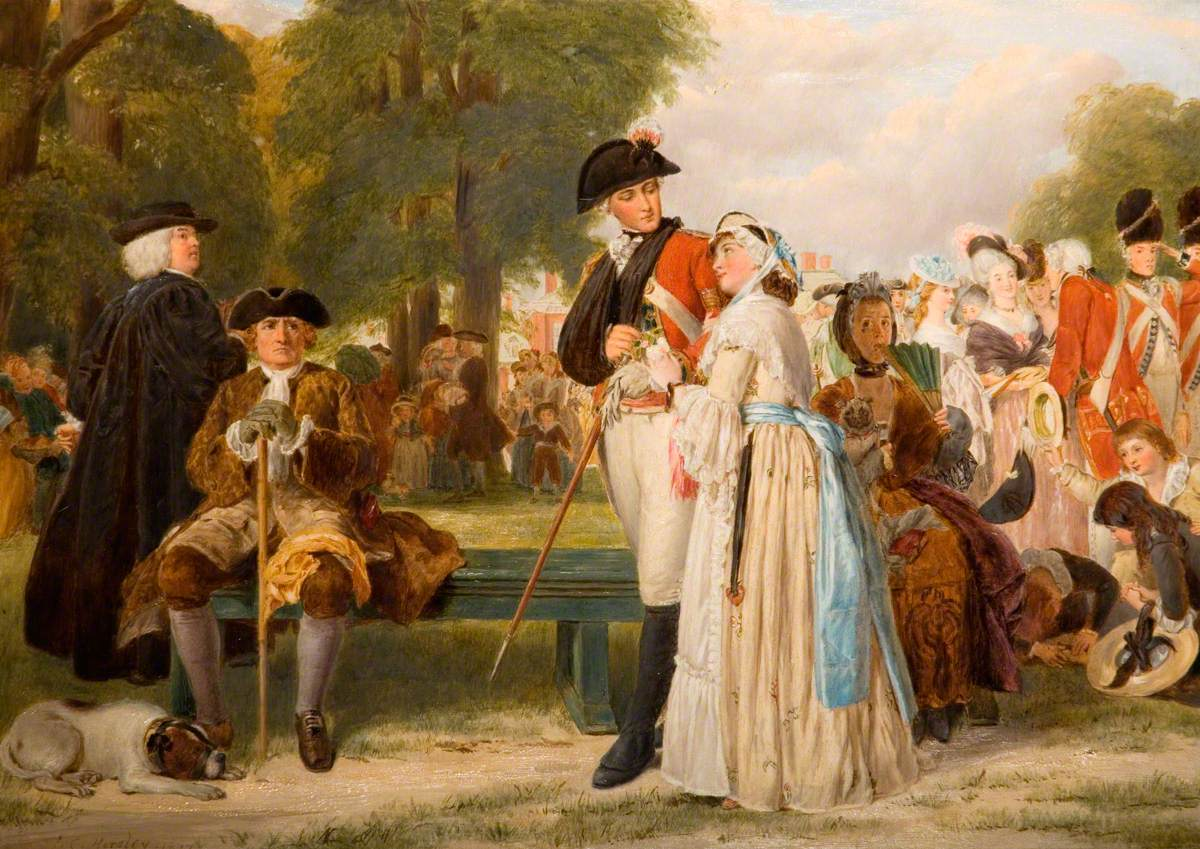
- Artist: John Callcott Horsley
- Year: 1877
- Type: Oil on canvas, genre painting
- Dimensions: 26.5 cm × 37 cm (10.4 in × 15 in)
- Location: Wolverhampton Art Gallery, Wolverhampton

The World Forgetting, By the World Forgot (Sunday Afternoon in Kensington Gardens) is an 1877 oil painting by the British artist John Callcott Horsley. A historical genre painting, it depicts a scene in Kensington Gardens around 1780, as people enjoy a Sunday afternoons leisure in the fashionable clothes of the later Georgian era. The tile is taken from the poem Eloisa to Abelard by Alexander Pope. While a serving Army Officer is shown to the right with his sweetheart, an older figure, presumably a retired veteran of previous war, sits nearby.

Horsley was associated with the Cranbrook Colony of artists during the mid-Victorian Era. The picture was displayed at the Royal Academy Exhibition of 1877 held at Burlington House in London. It was acquired by the toy manufacturer and art collector Sidney Cartwright, whose widow donated it to the Wolverhampton Art Gallery in 1887. There are a number of paintings by Horsley and other Cranbrook artists in the Gallery's collection.

== Bibliography ==
- Casteras, Stephen P. The Defining Moment: Victorian Narrative Paintings from the Forbes Magazine Collection. Mint Museum of Art, 1999.
- Roe, Sonia & Ellis, Andrew. Oil Paintings in Public Ownership in Staffordshire. Public Catalogue Foundation, 2007.
- Thompson, Carol (ed.) The Cranbrook Colony: Fresh Perspectives. Wolverhampton Art Gallery, 2010.
