= The Morning of St Valentine =

Painting by John Callcott Horsley

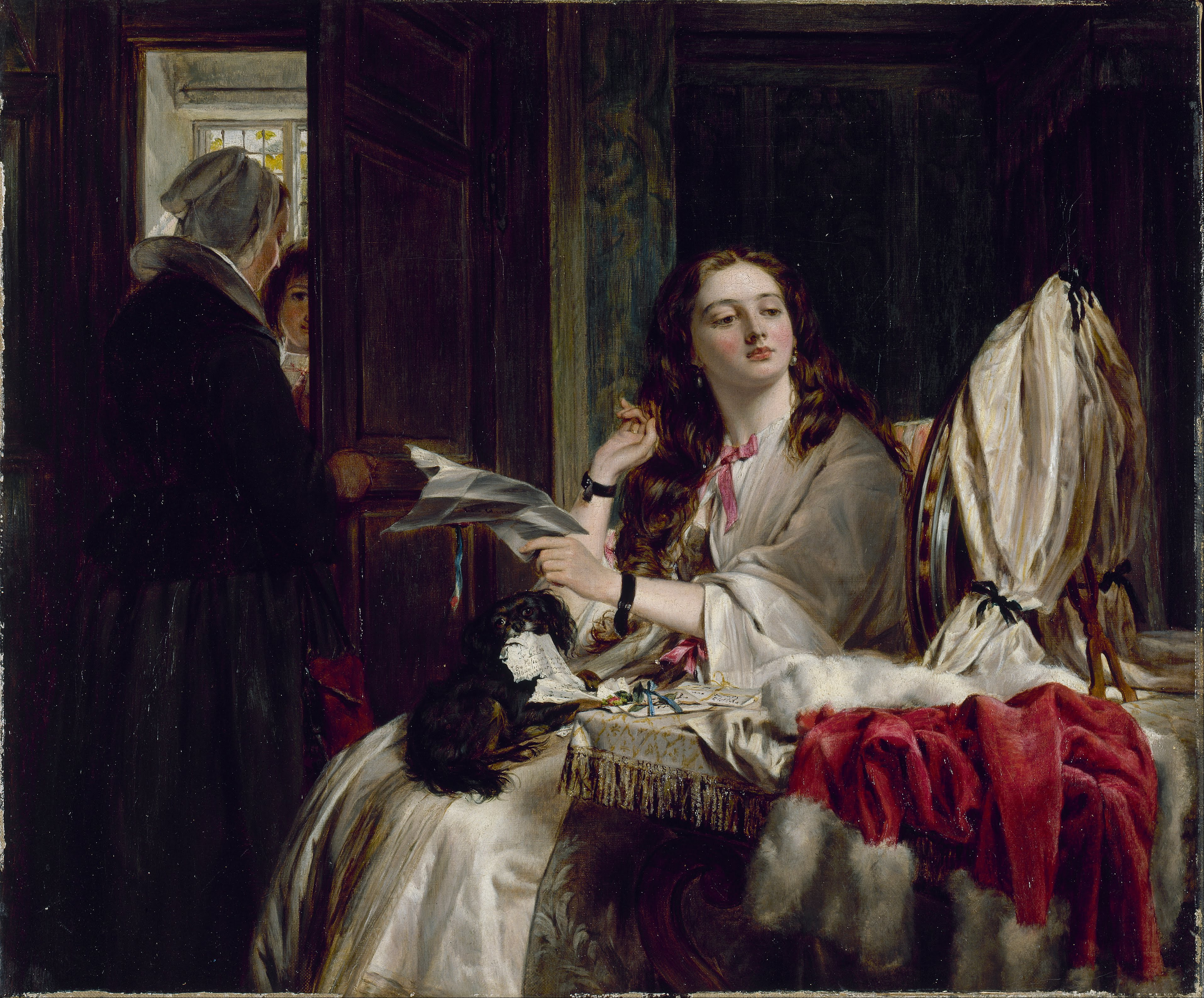
- Version in Walker Art Gallery
- Artist: John Callcott Horsley
- Year: 1863
- Type: Oil on canvas, genre painting
- Dimensions: 59.5 cm × 71.5 cm (23.4 in × 28.1 in)
- Location: Wolverhampton Art Gallery, Wolverhampton

The Morning of St Valentine is an 1863 oil painting by the British artist John Calcott Horsley. A genre painting, it depicts a young woman on Valentine's Day having received a letter from an admirer. It blends elements of different historical periods - while the woman's clothes are contemporary the servant's are Tudor. It was mistaken by one reviewer as being from the eighteenth century although it does not contain any Georgian features. Horsley was a noted painter of everyday scenes of Victorian life as well as history paintings, who became associated with the Cranbrook Colony of artists.

The painting was displayed at the Royal Academy Exhibition of 1863 at the National Gallery in London. It now belongs to the collection of Wolverhampton Art Gallery, having been donated by the widow of the toy manufacturer and art collector Sidney Cartwright in 1887. A second, smaller version was produced in 1865 and is now in the Walker Art Gallery in Liverpool. Other versions by Horsley also exist.

== Bibliography ==
- Roe, Sonia & Ellis, Andrew. Oil Paintings in Public Ownership in Staffordshire. Public Catalogue Foundation, 2007.
- Thompson, Carol (ed.) The Cranbrook Colony: Fresh Perspectives. Wolverhampton Art Gallery, 2010.
