= Book of Common Prayer (1845 illuminated version) =

United Church of England and Ireland prayer book

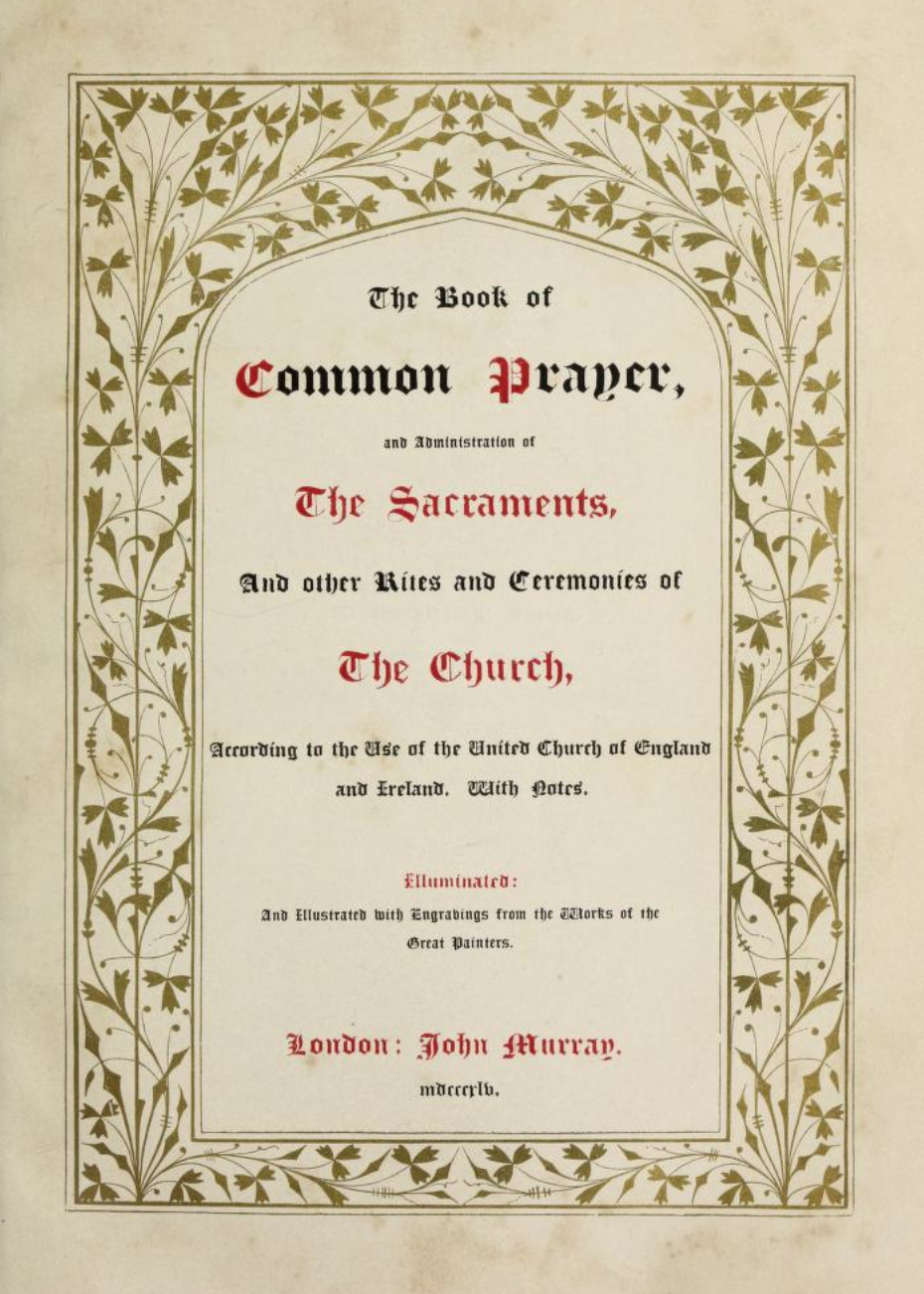
- Title page of the 1845 edition
- Editor: Thomas Cranmer
- Illustrator: Owen Jones; George Scharf; John C. Horsley; Henry Warren
- Language: English
- Subject: Anglican devotions; Anglican liturgy; Anglican sacraments; Anglican theology
- Genre: Liturgical book; Prayer book
- Publisher: John Murray (original), Easton Press (facsimile)
- Publication date: 1845
- Publication place: United Kingdom of Great Britain and Ireland
- Media type: Print (leatherbound)
- Pages: 526 (xlii+484)
- OCLC: 976554674

In 1845, the English-born Welsh architect Owen Jones designed an illustrated and decorated version of the 1662 Book of Common Prayer, the official prayer book of the United Church of England and Ireland. (Note: The full title of the 1845 illuminated version is: The Book of Common Prayer, and Administration of the Sacraments, and other Rites and Ceremonies of the Church, according to the Use of the United Church of England and Ireland, with Notes. Illuminated and Illustrated with Engravings from the Works of the Great Painters.) It was published in London by John Murray, with two new editions following in 1863.

== Overview ==
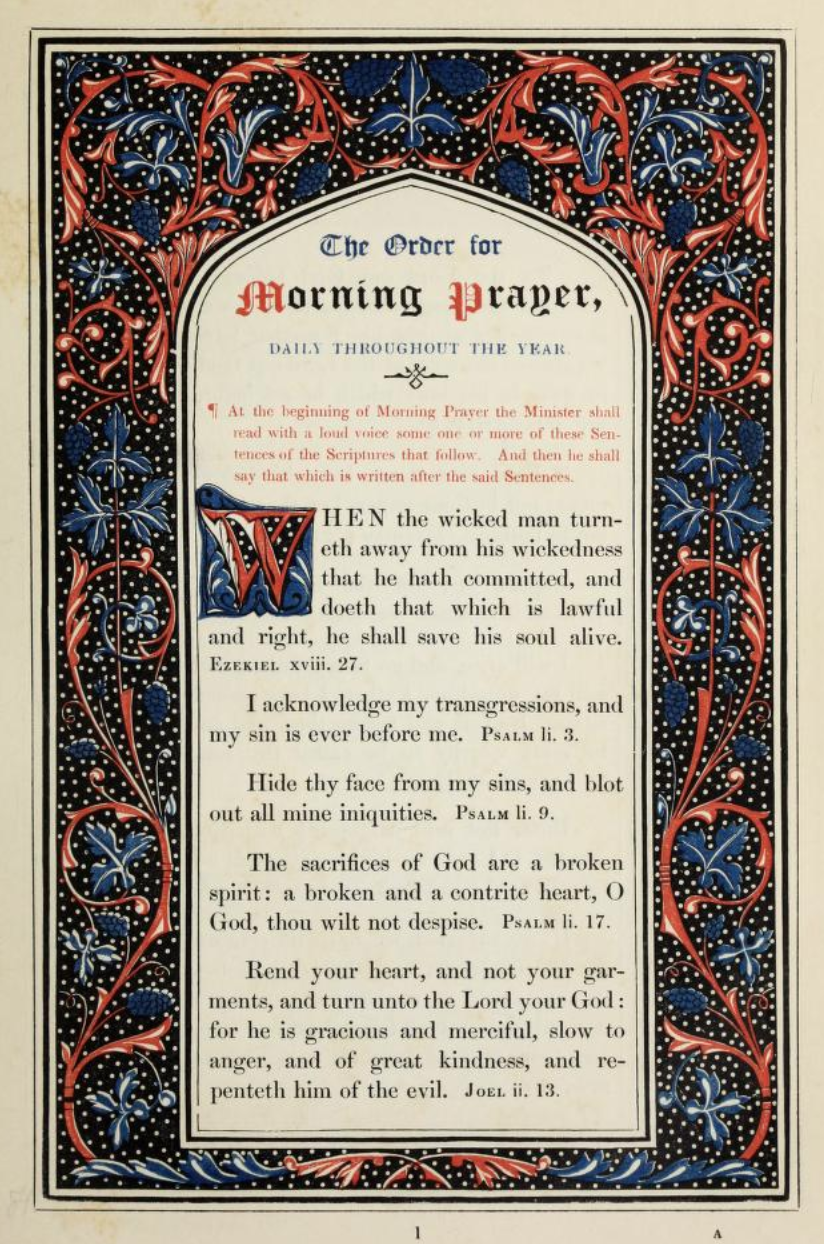
1845 edition

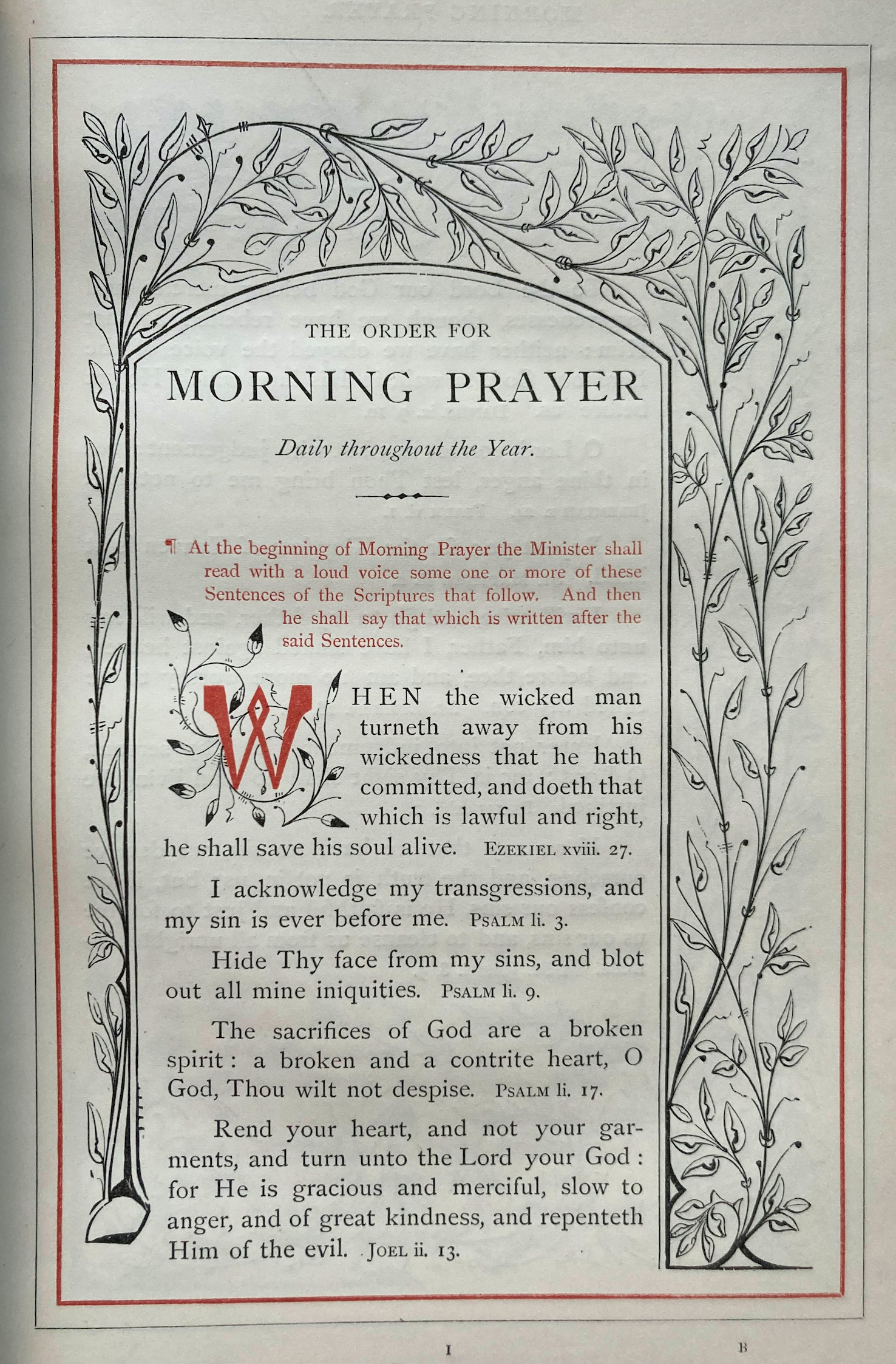
A 1863 edition

'The Order for Morning Prayer', the first page.

The illuminated Book of Common Prayer was published in London by John Murray in an edition of 4,000, hoping to follow the success of Jones's Ancient Spanish Ballads (1841). Apart from being an architect, Jones was also an influential designer of 'Book Beautiful'. His elaborate Prayer Book contains eight illuminated title pages for the eight sections, chromolithographed in blue, red, gold and green. Almost every page is ornamented with floral borders or patterns based on Celtic motifs and initial capitals inspired by medieval manuscripts. According to Appletons' Library Manual, there are 1,000 ornamental borders.

The first page which begins the order for Morning Prayer is decorated with a stylized floral border against a black background, which suggests East Indian inspiration.

The thirty-seven illustrations sprinkled throughout the text, were drawn by George Scharf after Raphael, Johann Friedrich Overbeck, Nicolas Poussin, Naeke, Fra Angelico (called "Ang. da Fiesole") and Fra Bartolomeo, under the superintendence of Lewis Gruner. The four full-page plates by John C. Horsley and Henry Warren for the Main Sacraments (Holy Communion, Baptism, Matrimony and Burial of the Dead) are set in a contemporary setting. According to Ruari McLean, "This was certainly in keeping with Jones's intention to bring his study of the arts to bear on his own times, and may also have seemed a good way to avoid reference to the medieval Roman Catholic Church."

== Editions ==
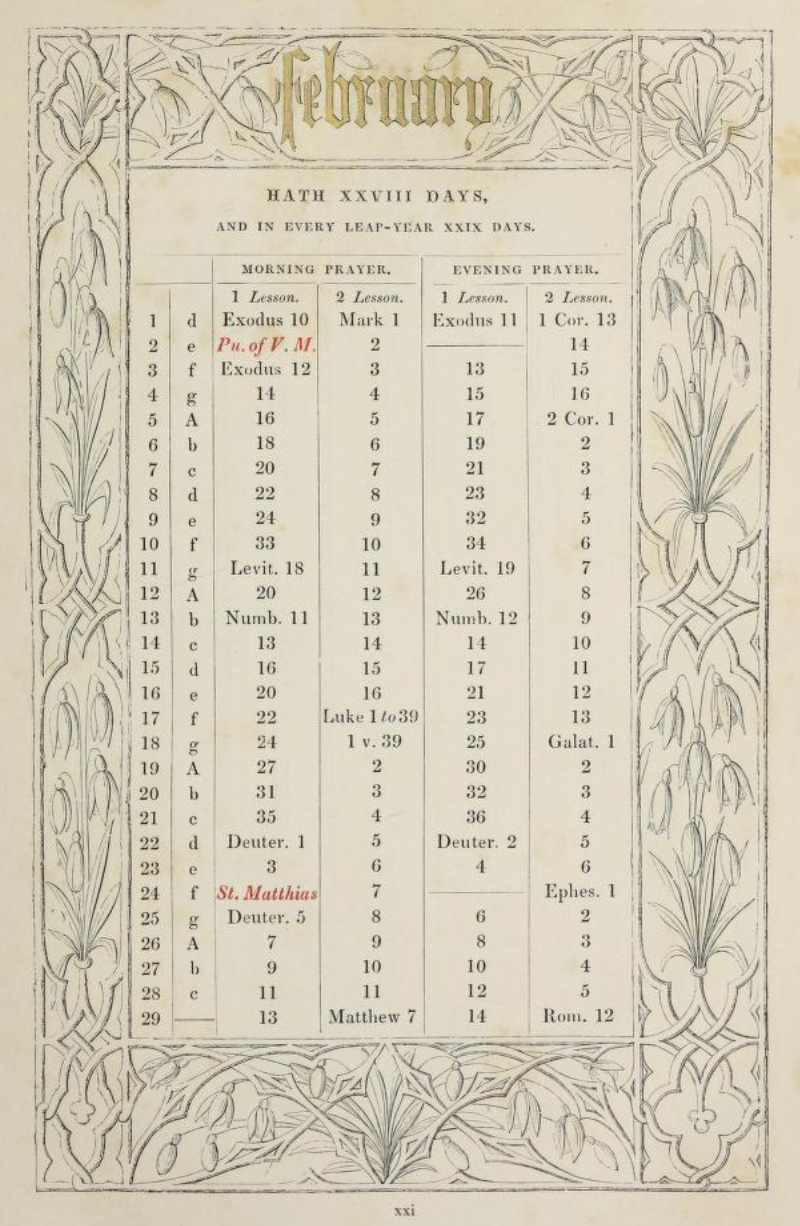
1845 edition

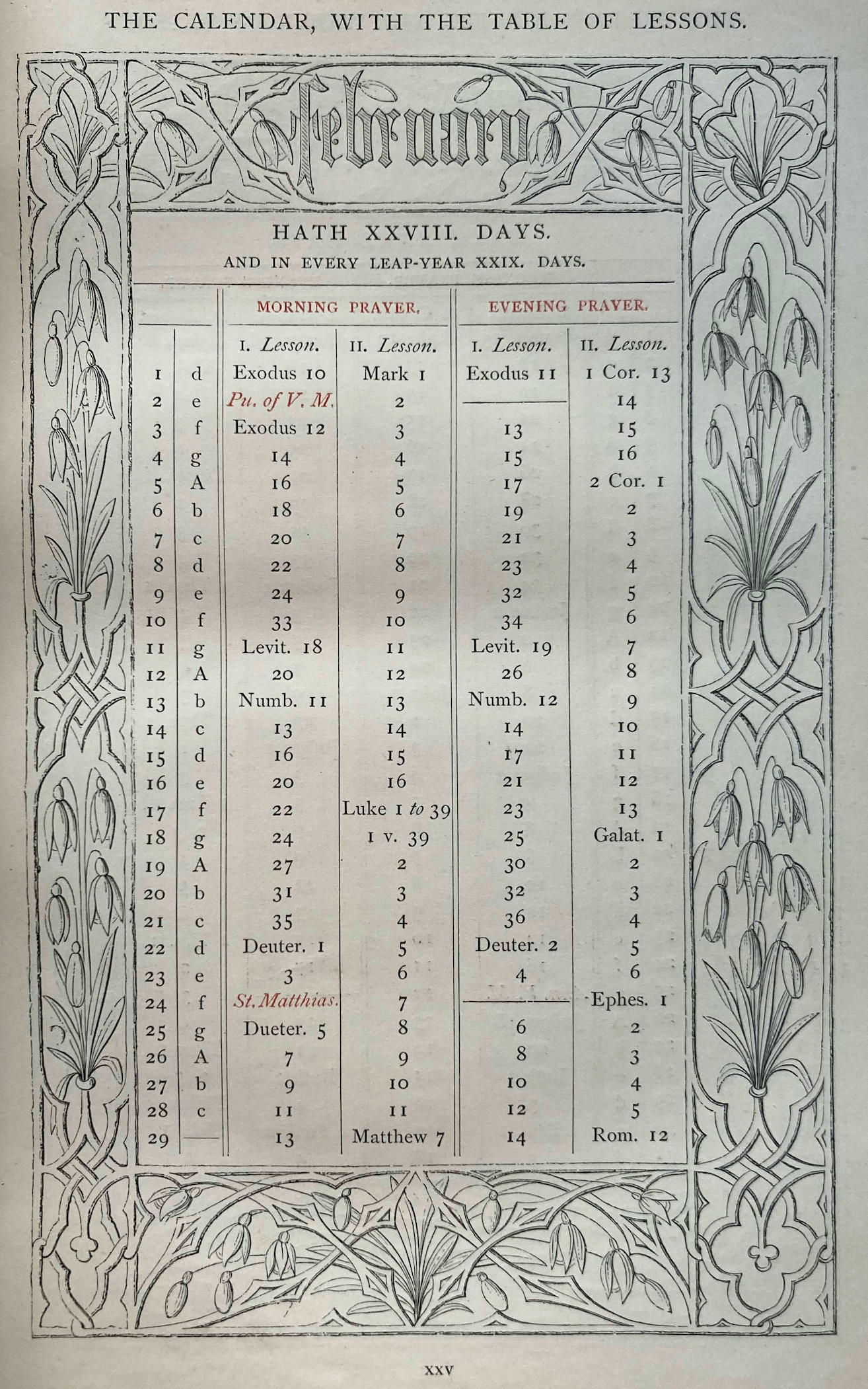
A 1863 edition with monochrome lithographic borders and ornaments

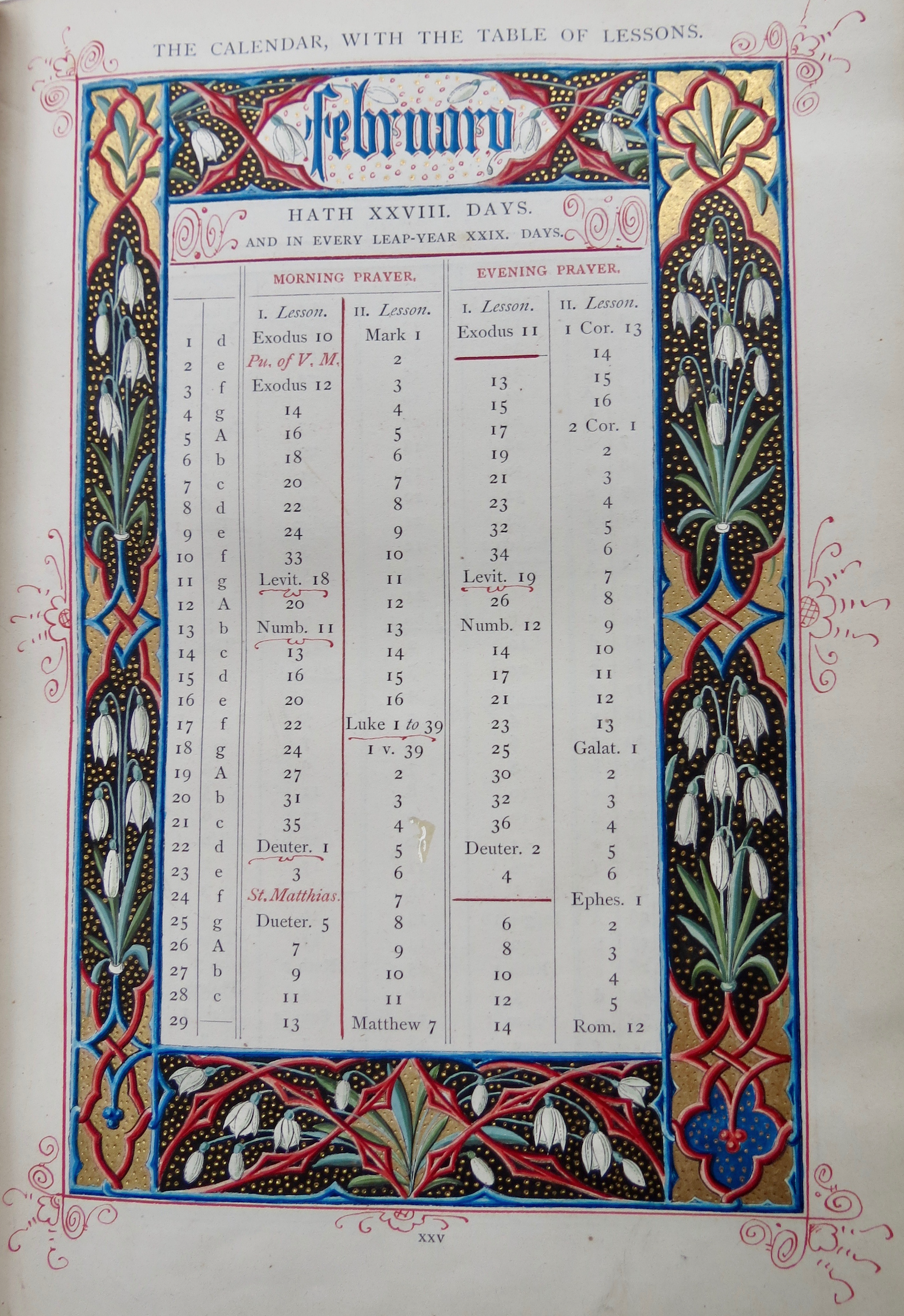
A 1863 edition with chromolithographic borders and ornaments

Liturgical calendar for February surrounded by floral border.

The Prayer Book was reprinted in 1850 which are almost identical copies of the first edition. John Murray subsequently published two new editions in 1863, of which one containing a large number of ornaments and floral borders printed in colours; while the other a relatively simple version without the eight illuminated title pages, and whose page ornaments were printed in monochrome like those in the first edition.

Two facsimile editions were published by Easton Press in 2008 and 2015, both bound in genuine leather. The former is called a "Collector's Edition", whose cover features the frontispiece pattern printed in gold and dark blue against an emerald green background. The latter is a limited edition of 800 copies, with the cover featuring a floral cross surrounded by an ornamental frame, both printed in gold, blue and red, against a black background.

== Reception ==
Anglican historians Charles Hefling and Cynthia Shattuck dubbed the illuminated prayer book "A Victorian 'Gothic' Prayer Book" in The Oxford Guide to The Book of Common Prayer: A Worldwide Survey, stating that this "stunning production" is among the best of Jones' designs for many publications. Its illumination, deviating from the long-standing tradition of restrained ornamentation in prayer book printings; The Oxford Guide, published by Oxford University Press, opines that the book "points to the direction that books in general were to follow in the Victorian Age".

== See also ==
- Book of Common Prayer
- Book of Common Prayer (1843 illustrated version)
- Golden Age of Illustration
- Livre d'art
