= John Callcott Horsley =

British artist (1817–1903)

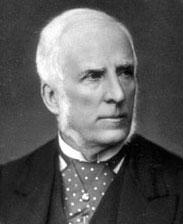
John Callcott Horsley

John Callcott Horsley RA (29 January 1817 – 18 October 1903) was an English academic painter of genre and historical scenes, illustrator, and designer of the first Christmas card. He was a member of the artists' colony in Cranbrook.

== Childhood and education ==
Horsley was born in London, the son of William Horsley, the musician, and grand-nephew of Sir Augustus Callcott. His sister Mary Elizabeth Horsley wed the famous British engineer Isambard Kingdom Brunel in 1836. Horsley was mentored by William Mulready and Augustus Wall Callcot who sent him at age thirteen to study at Dr Henry Sass's academy where he met D.G Rossetti, J. Millais and W.P. Frith; in his biography Horsley recalls Dr Sass as being vain and untalented. Following preparatory school Horsley studied painting at the Royal Academy schools where he met Thomas Webster. He exhibited The Pride of the Village at the Royal Academy Exhibition of 1839. It was later part of the Vernon Gift to the nation.

== Family life ==
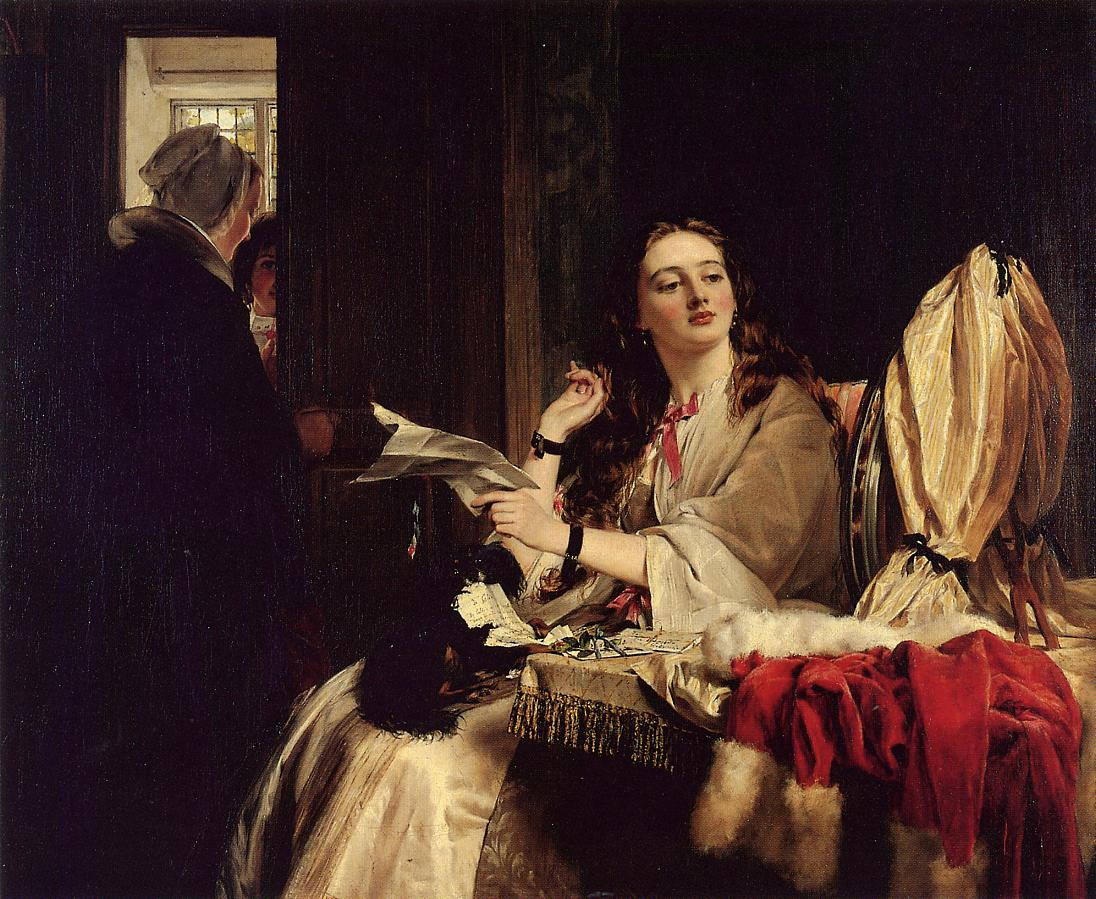
The Morning of St Valentine, 1863

Horsley married Elvira Walter in 1846 with whom he had three sons: Edward (1848), Frank (1849), and Harry (1850). Elvira died of consumption in 1852 followed by the deaths of Edward and Harry in 1854 and Frank in 1857 due to scarlet fever.

Horsley remarried, to Rosamund Haden, who came from a family of distinguished surgeons—her father Charles Haden had a practice in Sloan Street and her brother Francis Seymour Haden was a surgeon and etcher, who founded the Royal Society of Painters, Etchers and Engravers in 1880. Rosamund gave birth to Walter Charles (1855–1934), Hugh (1856), Victor (1857-1916), Emma (1858), Fanny (1859-1949), Gerald (1862) and Rosamund Brunel (1864-1949). Gerald grew up to be an architect, Walter an artist also studying at the RA Schools. Sir Victor Horsley became famous as a surgeon and neuropathologist, and a prominent supporter of the cause of experimental research. Fanny (Frances) became Lady Whitelegge. Hugh and Emma died of scarlet fever.

After his wedding to Rosamund in 1854 Horsley and his new wife toured the Midlands for five months to establish contacts with wealthy industrialists for portrait commissions. Horsley moved into 'Willesley', his house in Cranbrook in 1861, joining the Cranbrook Colony; while maintaining a home in London. The architect Richard Shaw adds "...tall chimneys and cosy 'inglenooks.'" in the Jacobean style to 'Willesley'.

== Career ==
Horsley's paintings were largely of historical subjects set in the seventeenth and eighteenth centuries, influenced by the Dutch masters Pieter de Hooch and Vermeer. Examples are "Malvolio", "L'Allegro and il Penseroso" (painted for the Prince Consort), "Le Jour des Morts" and "A Scene from Don Quixote".

As a young artist Horsley was patronised by the collector John Sheepshanks, who bought two of Horsley's paintings: The Rival Performers (1839) and Youth and Age (1839), both of which are now part of the V&A collection. Callcott Horsley exhibited a second painting entitled 'Youth and Age' at the Royal Academy in 1851.

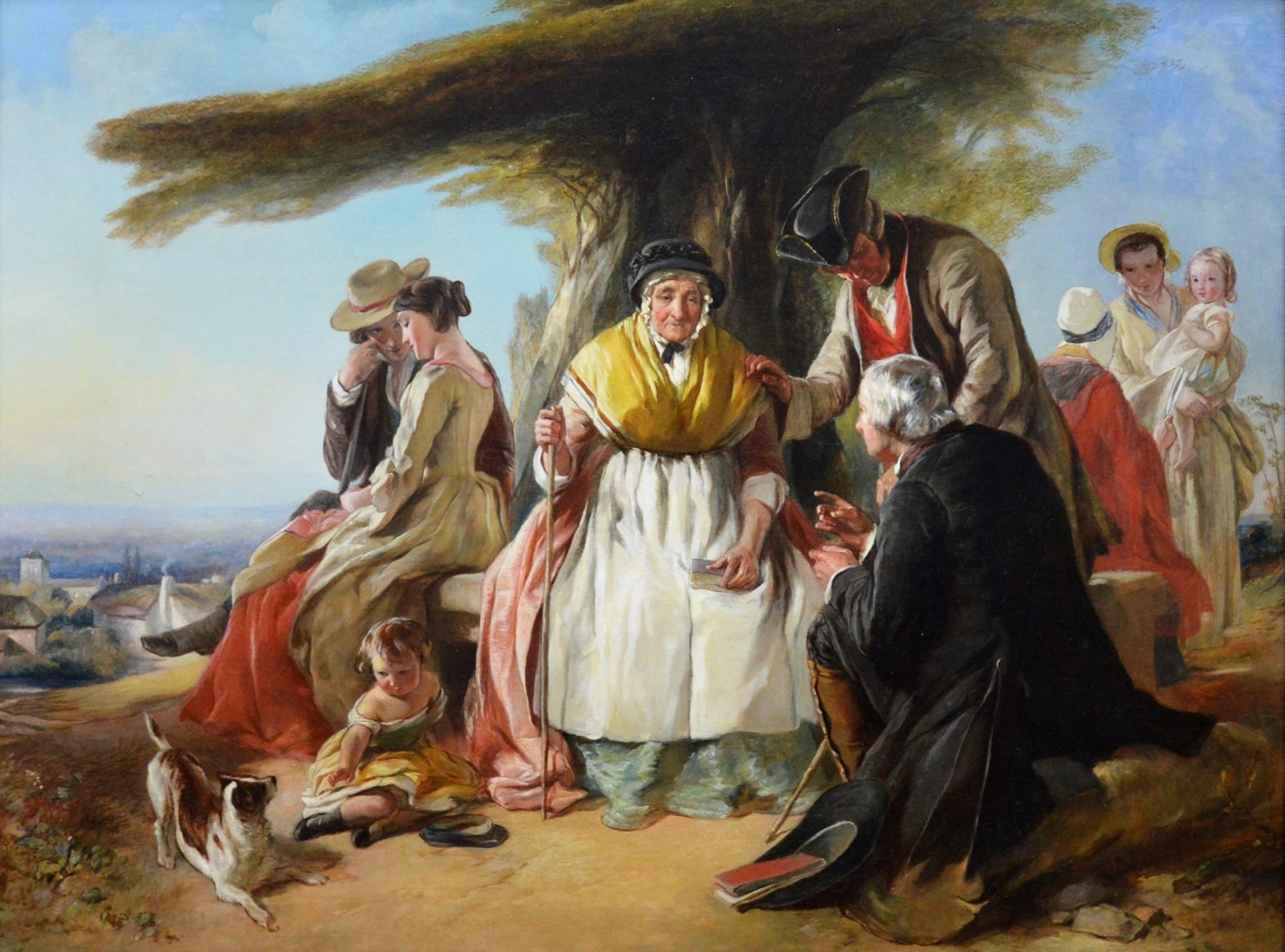
'Youth and Age' by John Callcott Horsley. Exhibited at the Royal Academy in 1851.

In 1843 his cartoon (preliminary drawing) of "St Augustine Preaching" won a prize in the competition to provide interior decorations for Palace of Westminster. This led to his being selected in 1844 as one of the six painters commissioned to execute frescoes there. He painted Religion (1847) in the House of Lords, and Satan touched by Ithuriel's Spear while whispering evil dreams to Eve (1848). He also produced three of the four full-page plates illustrating the Main Sacraments for the 1845 illuminated Book of Common Prayer designed by Owen Jones. In 1864 he became a Royal Academician (RA). Horsley had much to do with organizing the winter exhibitions of "Old Masters" at Burlington House after 1870.

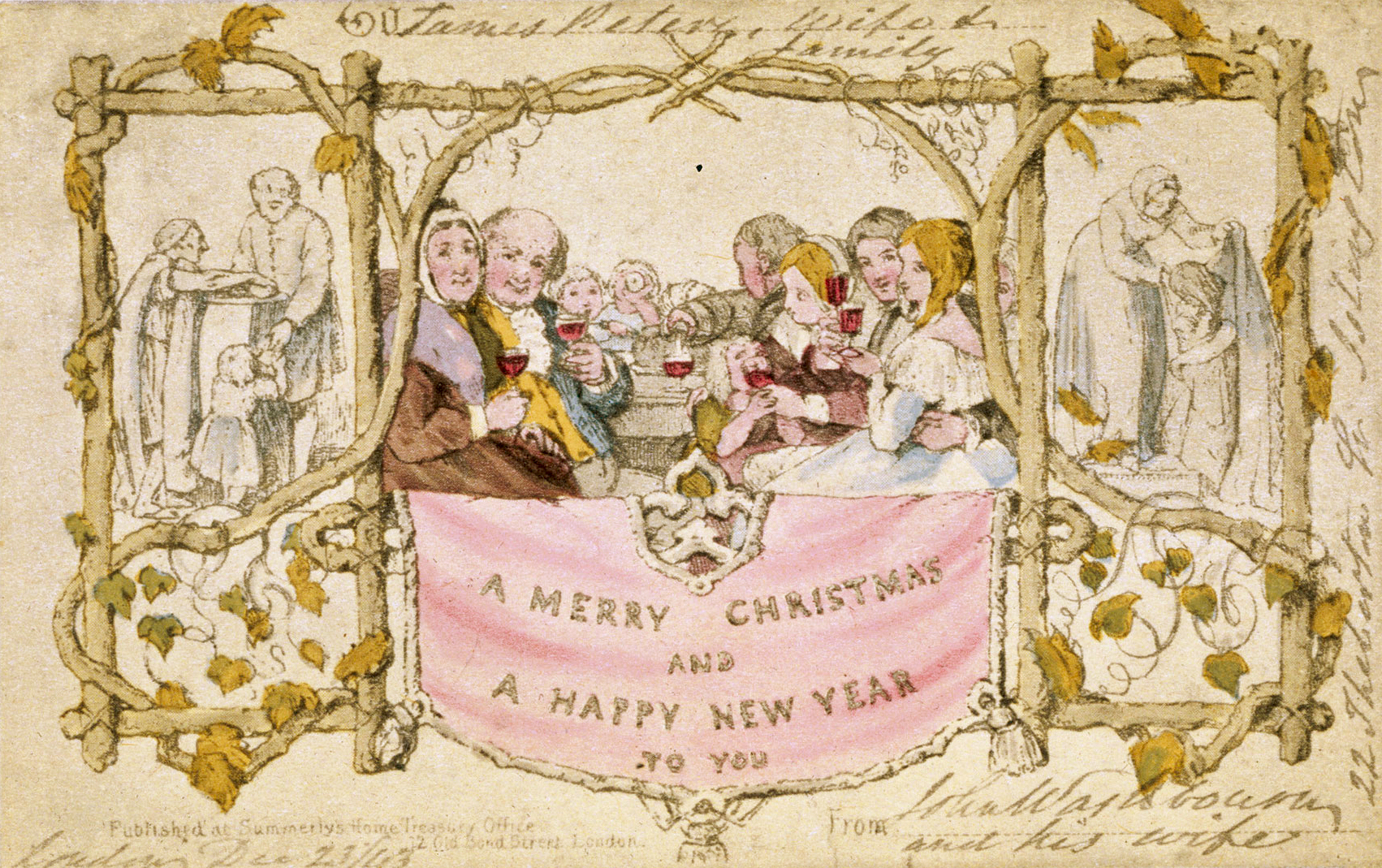
The world's first Christmas card

Horsley was rector and treasurer of the Royal Academy from 1875 to 1890 and 1882 to 1897 respectively. He earned the nickname 'Clothes-Horsley' for his opposition to the use of nude life models. When, during the 1880s, the example of the French Salon began to affect the Academy exhibitors, and paintings of the nude became the fashion, he protested against the innovation, and his attitude caused Punch to give him the sobriquet of "Mr J. C(lothes) Horsley" (a pun on clothes horse).

Protests against the nude in 1885 assumed a variety of forms: Moore's White Hydrangea was damaged by a 'scratching fiend' during the summer exhibition and life studies executed by Academy students were stolen. However, it was a letter printed in The Times on 20 May which proved the catalyst for igniting a national controversy around the exhibition of the nude. The letter was titled 'A Woman's Plea' and signed 'British Matron'. In fact it was penned by J. C. Horsley ...

He resigned from the academy in 1897, and became a "retired Academician". In 1843 Horsley designed the first ever Christmas card, commissioned by Henry Cole. It caused some controversy because it depicted a small child drinking wine. He also designed the Horsley envelope, a pre-paid envelope that was the precursor to the postage stamp.

In 1856 Horsley was photographed at "The Photographed Institute" by Robert Howlett, as part of a series of portraits of "fine artists". The picture was among a group exhibited at the Art Treasures Exhibition in Manchester in 1857.

Horsley was a member of the London-based Etching Club contributing illustrations to editions of "The Deserted Village" (Oliver Goldsmith) and "Songs of Shakespeare". He also illustrated a number of other books including "Little Princes" by Eliza Slater (London: Henry G. Bohn, 1890).

== Gallery ==
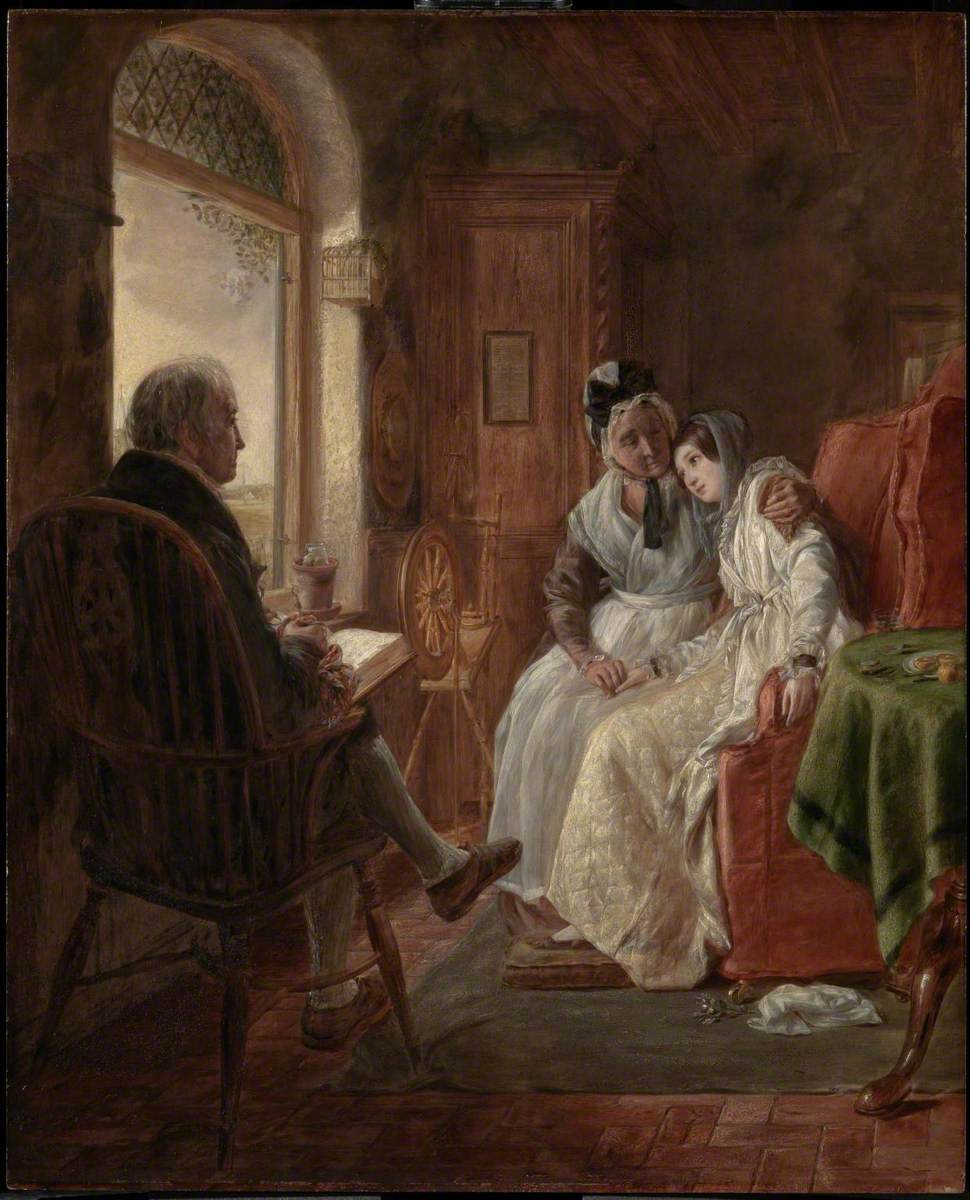
The Pride of the Village, 1839

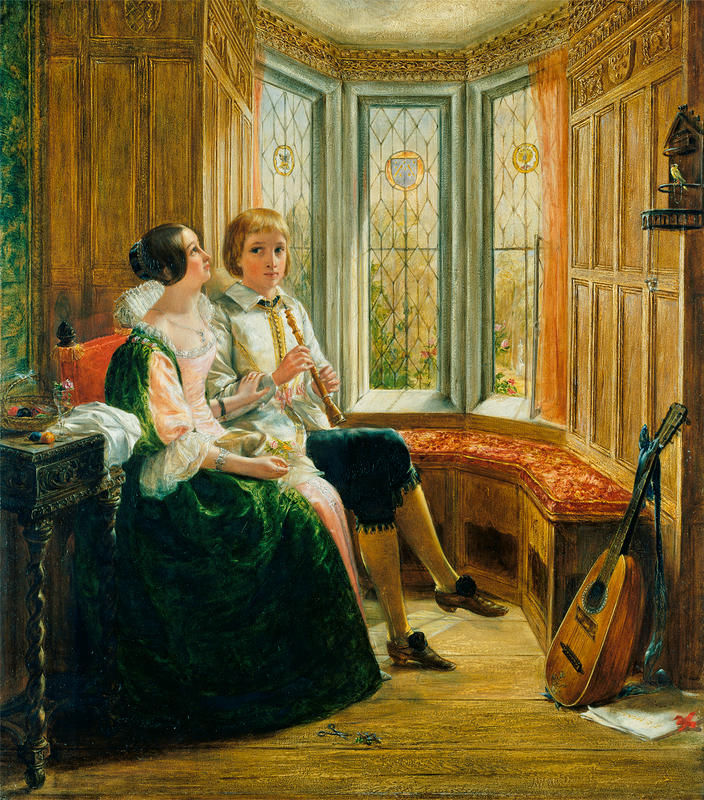
The Rival Performers, 1839

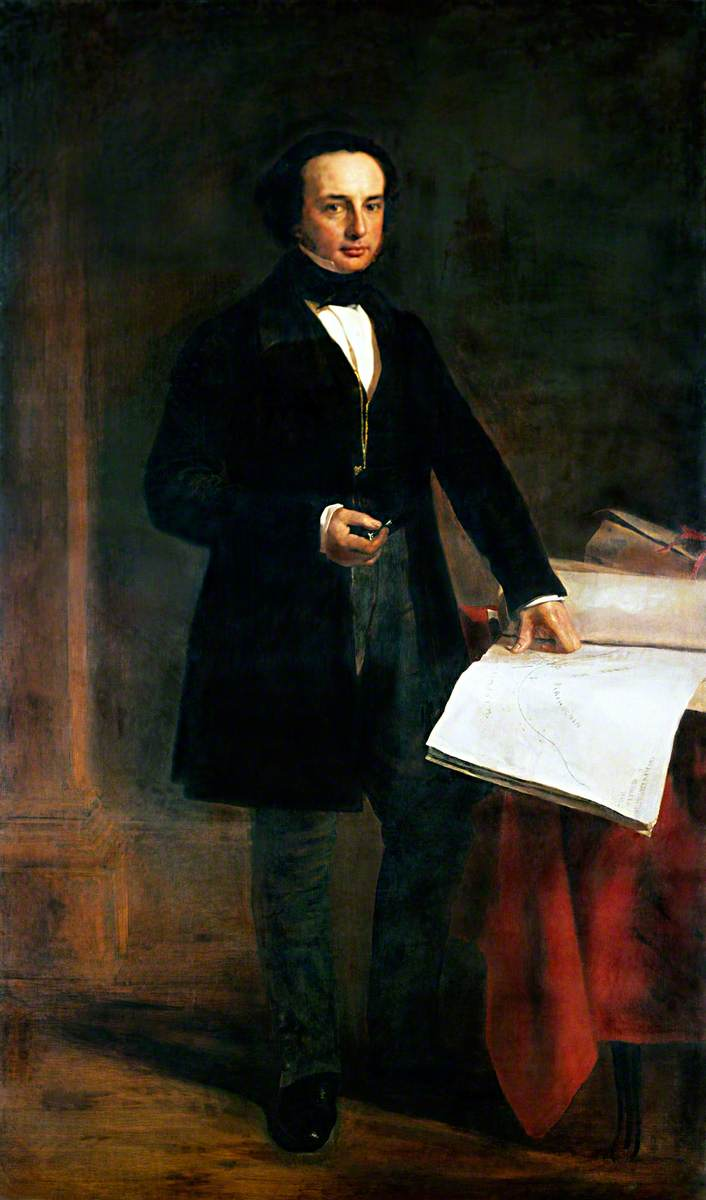
Portrait of Isambard Kingdom Brunel, 1848

Showing a Preference, 1860

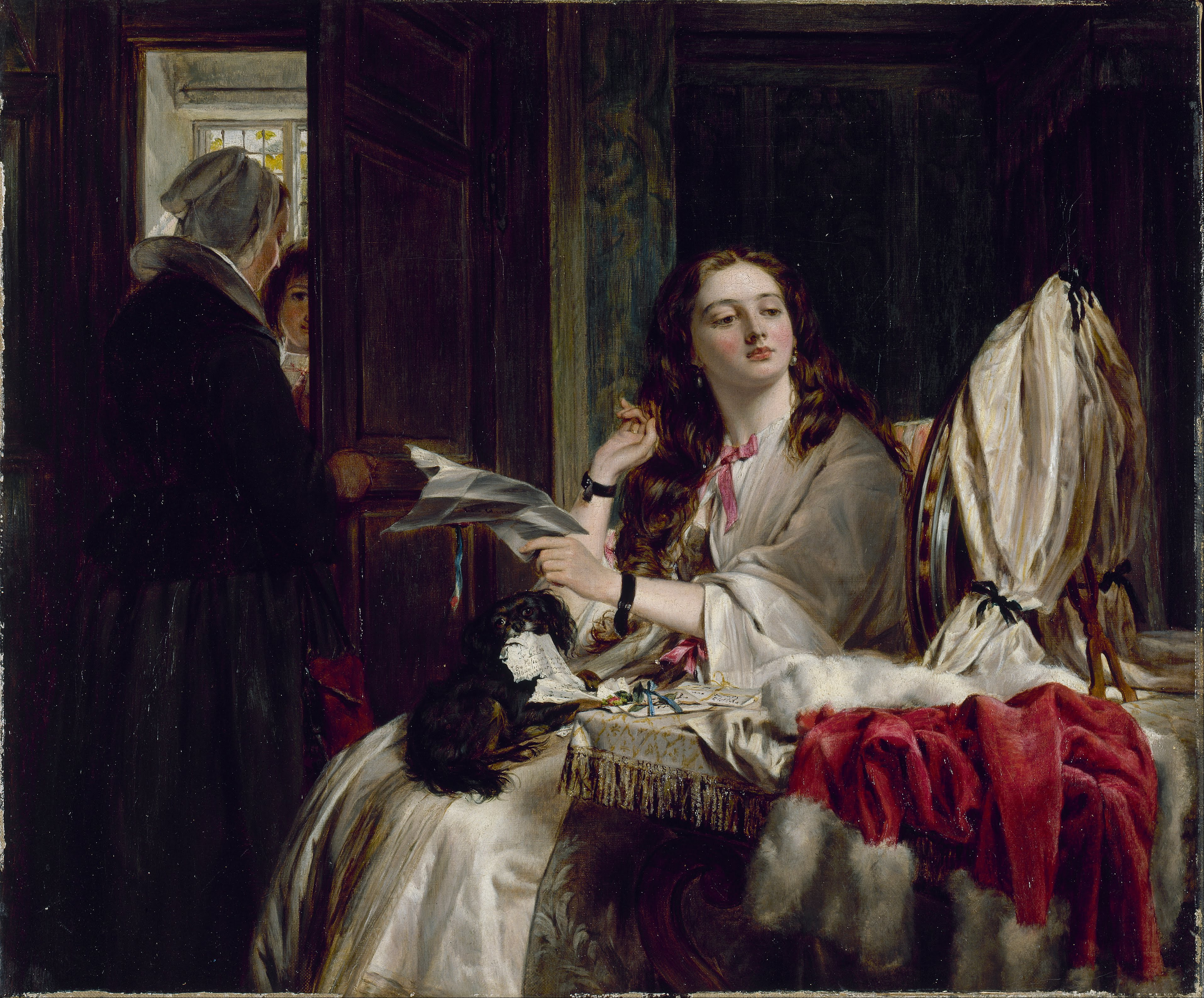
The Morning of St Valentine, 1863

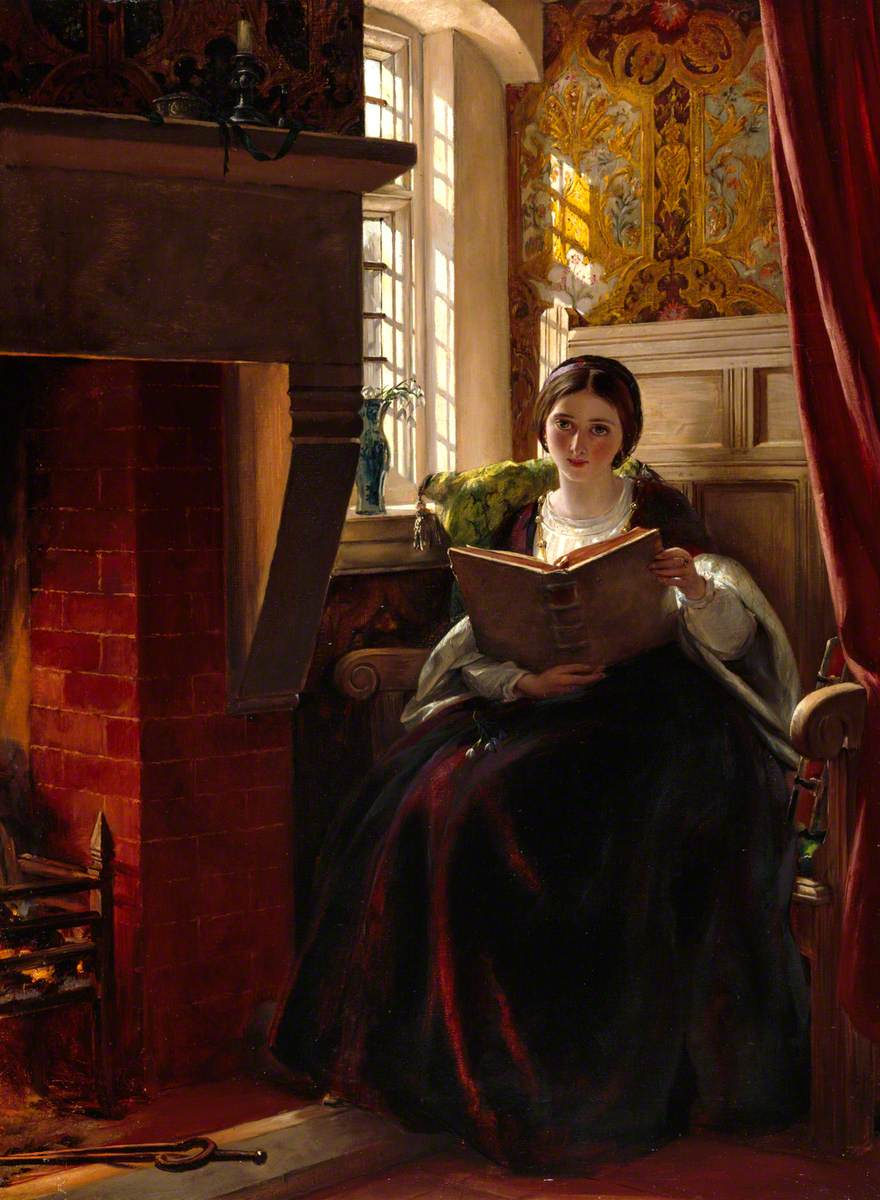
A Pleasant Corner, 1865

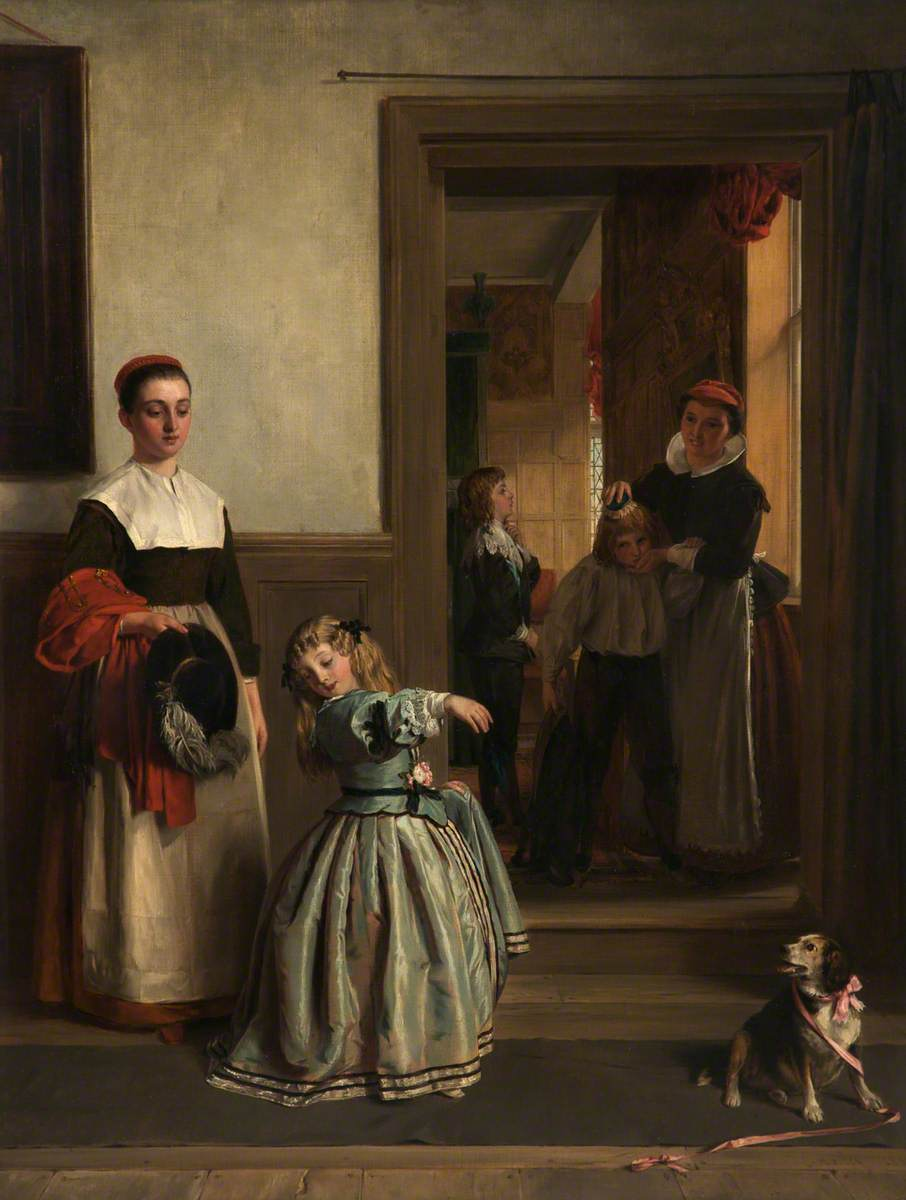
Going to a Party, 1866

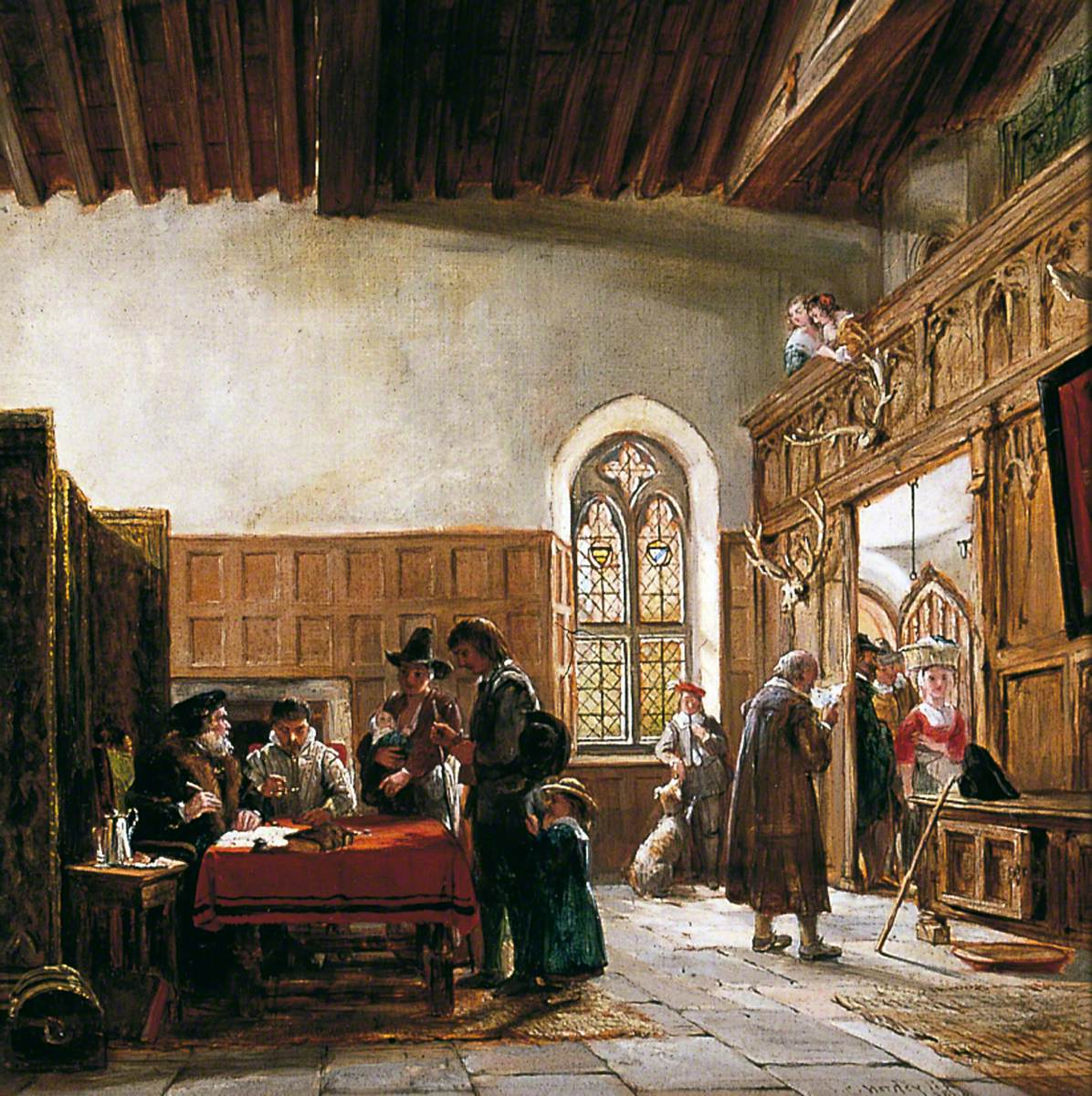
Rent Day at Haddon Hall, 1866

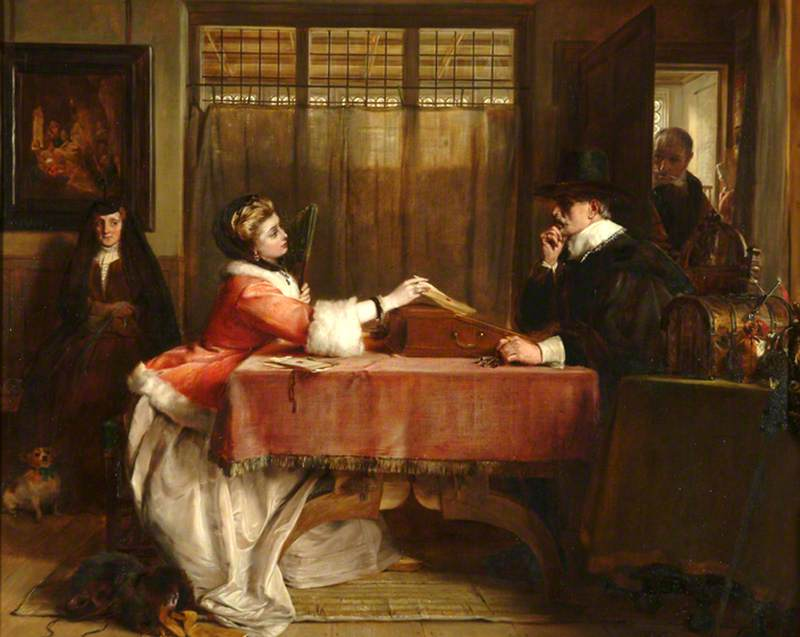
The Banker's Private Room, Negotiating a Loan, 1870

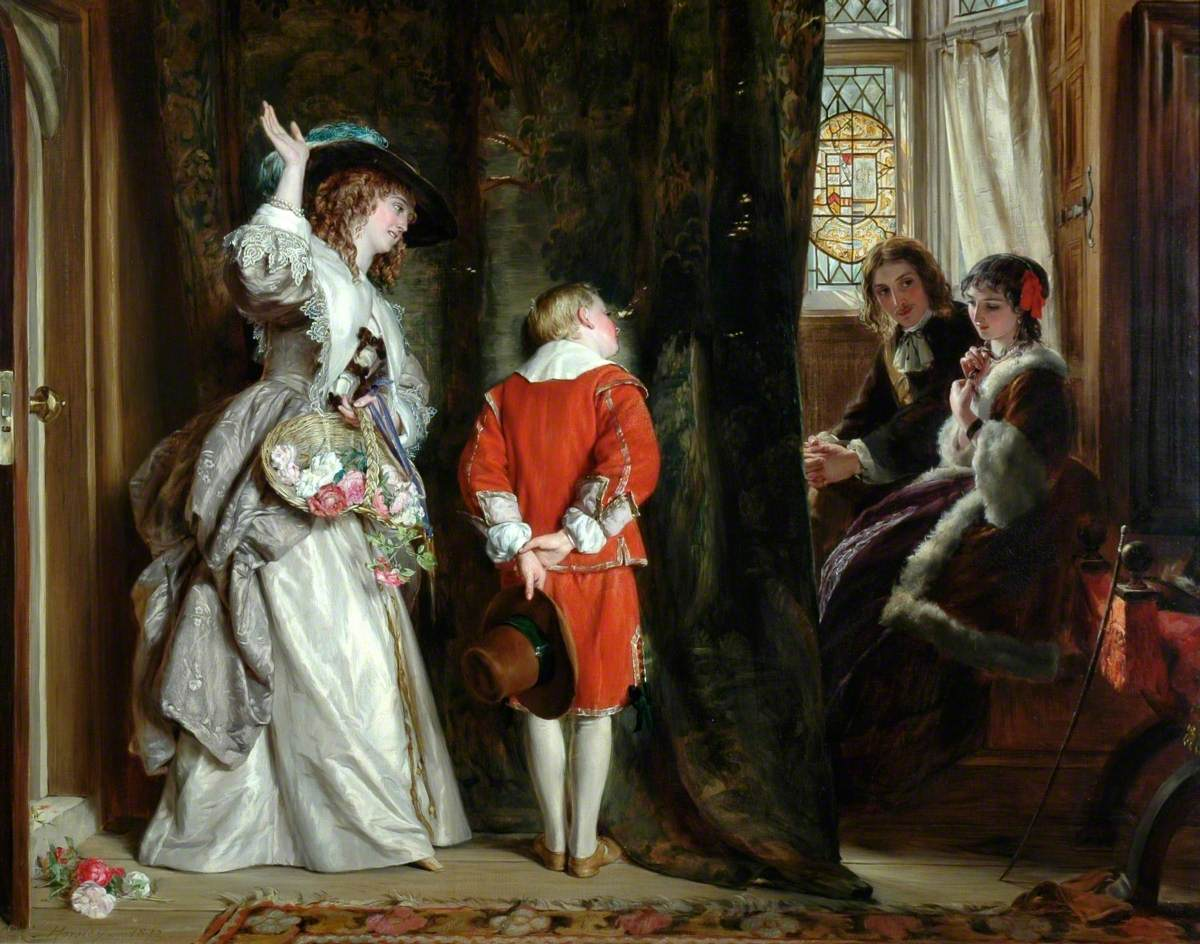
Pay for Peeping, 1872

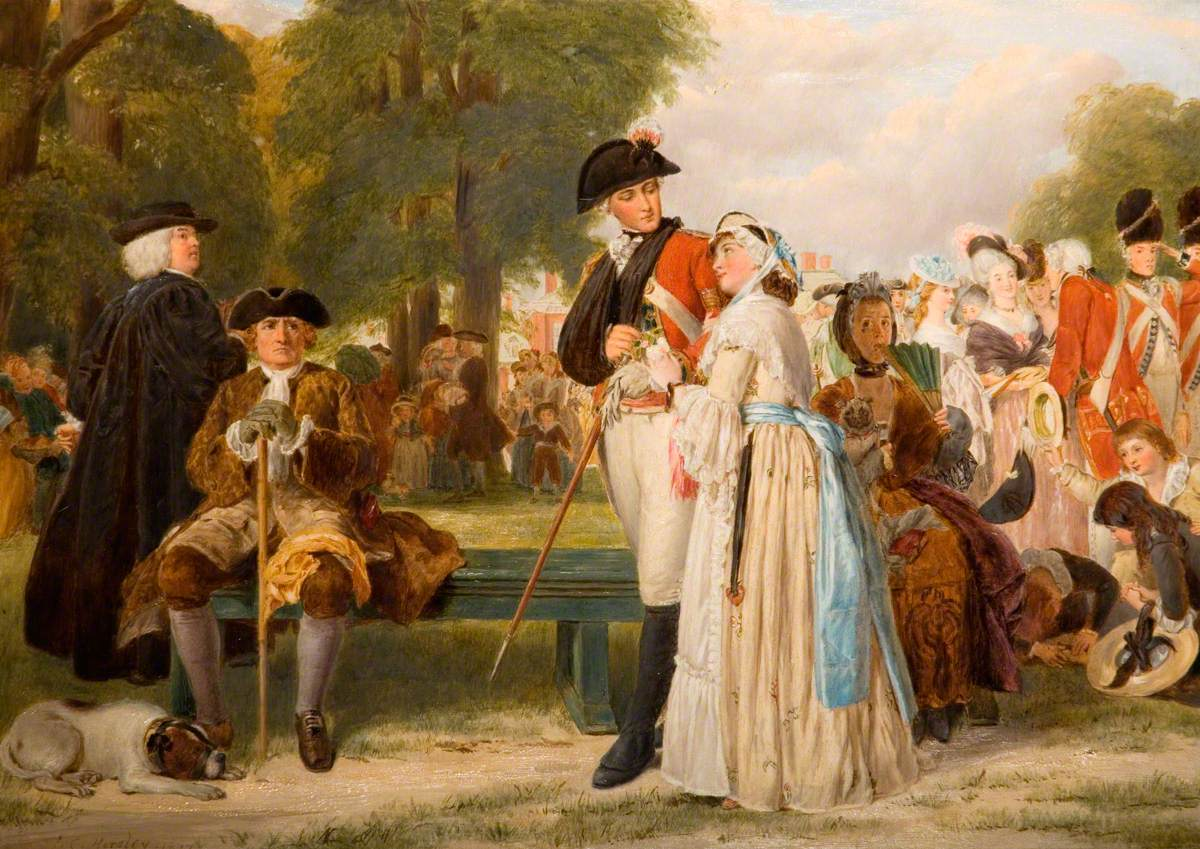
The World Forgetting, By the World Forgot, 1877

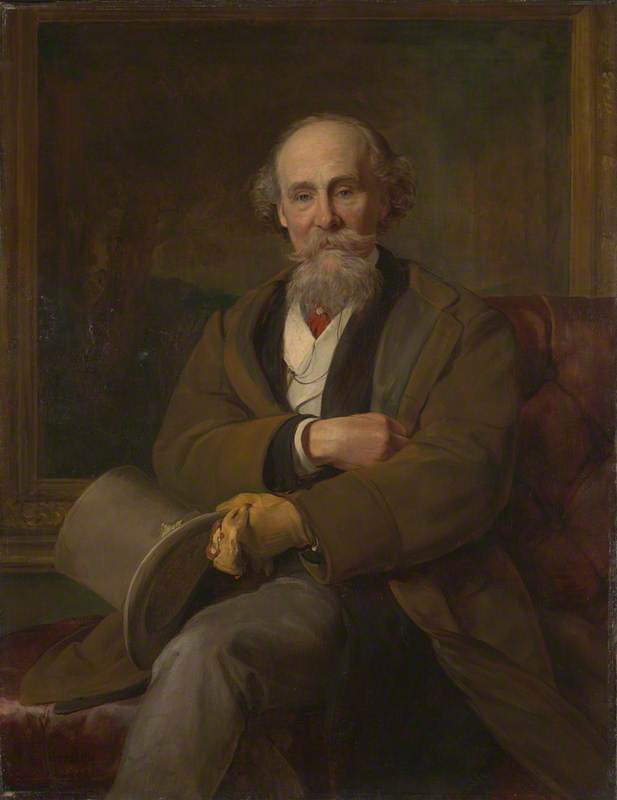
Portrait of Martin Colnaghi, 1889

== See also ==
- Greeting card
