= Guild of St Raphael =

Christian organization

The Guild of St Raphael, founded in 1915, was a Christian organisation dedicated to promoting, supporting and practicing Christ's ministry of healing as an integral part of the life and worship of the Church. Originating from within the Anglican Communion, it expanded to include members from other Churches and became ecumenical in outlook. It was also international in scope with over one hundred branches throughout the world. The Guild took its name from the Book of Tobit, where Saint Raphael is the angel who helps Tobias find his way. The Guild stated it was: "the Anglican means of teaching the arts and sciences of the ministry of healing by prayer, sacraments and by full co-operation with the medical profession".

In October 2015, the Guild merged with the Guild of Health - from which it had originally emerged - under the formal title of The Guild of Health and St. Raphael. The remainder of this article contains the text as it appeared before the merger. Information about membership and the publications Guild News and Chrism can now be found at www.gohealth.org.uk

== Origins and history ==
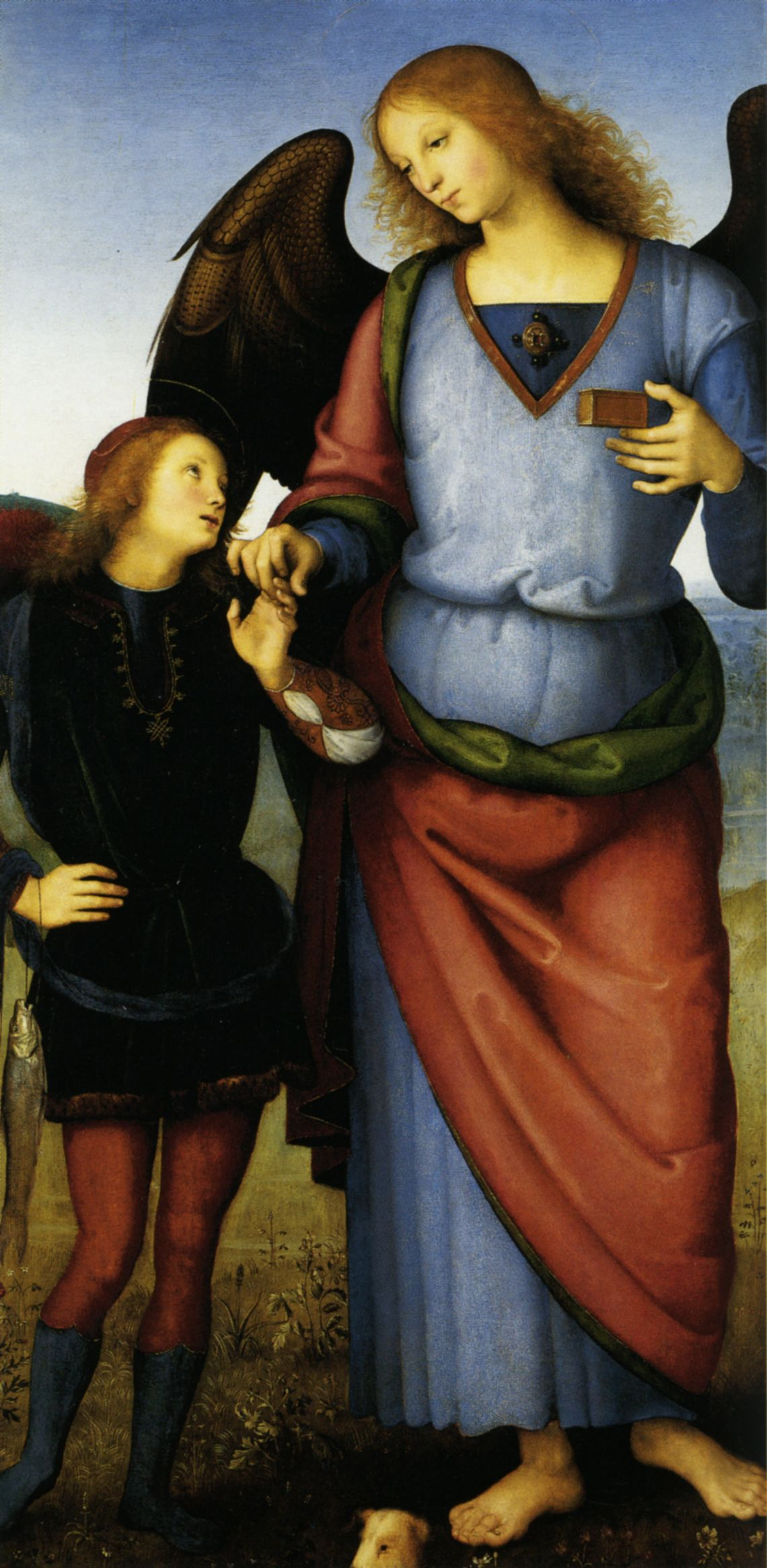
Tobit and the Archangel Raphael; Pietro Perugino

Some Internet sources place the founding of the Guild by some of the members of the Stella Matutina, including Robert Felkin. There is little documentary evidence available to support this assertion outside of the book by Francis X. King, (1989), and he asserts that the Guild rapidly became completely separate from any of the practices of Stella Matutina. The available evidence suggests it never was connected.

Recent minutes (published in Chrism, 2006) show that the driving personalities behind the foundation of the Guild in 1915 were a Miss Caroline Biggs, recorded as Secretary of the newly formed Guild, with the Reverend Canon R. P. Roseveare of St Paul's Deptford, recorded as its first Warden.

By 1920, under Canon Roseveare's Wardenship, the fourth Annual Report gives the membership as 19 priest members, 26 priest associates, 2 lay members and 248 lay associates. The Guild had already penetrated into Africa, Canada, New Zealand, India and China.

A letter to the Times, published in 1933 by Bishop W. W. Hough, Warden of the Guild, notes that "The movement has grown. There are now over 2,000 lay members, and 300 priest members who are practicing spiritual healing in most of the dioceses in the land."

== Works ==
Its main emphasis is on the actual practice of the healing ministry through its local branches, and this is where its strength lies. Its members observe a simple rule of prayer, study and work for this ministry. Their aim is always to promote Christ's ministry of healing - looking not just for physical healing, but for the healing of the whole person.

The Guild looks too for the healing of communities and of God's creation itself - taking into account those many social and political factors which cause 'dis-ease' in our broken and divided world.

Prayer for healing is at the heart of the Guild's work, as are the sacraments of healing - anointing and the sacramental act of the laying on of hands. But members make use of other healing actions as well - the ministry of listening and silence, counselling, informal liturgies and simple symbolic actions. The Guild has in the past gained a high-profile for its study and recognition of exorcism. In 1960, the Rev. Henry Cooper, Chaplain to the Guild, argued that successful exorcists are people who know something about psychiatry and work well with doctors. They resort to bell, book and candle only when psychiatrists have given up. A Henry Cooper Lecture is given each year in Cooper's memory.

The Guild also engages in extensive theological education and research. In particular through its periodical, Chrism, mentioned below.

The Guild has emphasized cooperation with members of the medical profession and others involved in healthcare work.

== Periodical ==
The Guild publishes a half-yearly periodical, Chrism, in which it endeavours to explore different aspects of the healing scene. Past editions have dealt with diverse topics such as Children and Healing, Touch in a Fearful Society, Animals and Healing, A Theology of Health for Today, M.E. (Chronic Fatigue Syndrome), Dementia, Genetic Engineering and Healing, Alcohol and Substance Abuse.

== Wardens ==
- 1915 Reverend Canon R. P. Roseveare of St Paul's Deptford
- 1920s/1930s Right Reverend W. W. Hough, Bishop of Woolwich
- 1940s Reverend T. W. Crafter
- 1959 Reverend F. S. Sinker, Vicar of Offchurch, Diocese of Coventry
- 1980s Right Reverend Cecil Richard Rutt, Bishop of Leicester

== Bibliography ==
- Guild of St. Raphael: "The Ministry of Healing". Booklet, 2005
- Henry Cooper, Deliverance and Healing: The Place of Exorcism in the Healing Ministry, London: Guild of Health and Guild of St. Raphael, 1972
- The Priest's Vade Mecum. A Manual for the Visiting of the Sick, 1945, edited by Guild Warden Rev. T. W. Crafter, put forth by the Literature Committee of the Guild of St Raphael.
- Christian Healing: History and Hope; by Mary Theresa Webb, 2002
- Psychology and Life; by Leslie D. Weatherhead, 1935
- Guild News, March 2006
