= Charles Willis (cricketer) =

English cricketer

Personal information
- Full name: Charles Francis Willis
- Born: 15 April 1827; Hawkhurst, Kent
- Died: 19 November 1895 (aged 68); Bassingham, Lincolnshire
- Role: Bowler

Domestic team information
- Years: Team
- 1847–1849: Oxford University
- 1849–1850: Gentlemen of Kent
- 1850: Kent
- FC debut: 27 May 1847 Oxford Univ. v Marylebone Cricket Club (MCC)
- Last FC: 15 August 1850 Gentlemen of Kent v Gentlemen of England

Reverend Charles Francis Willis (15 April 1827 – 19 November 1895) was an English clergyman and amateur cricketer who played between 1847 and 1850.

== Early life ==
Willis was born at Hawkhurst in Kent in 1827, the younger son of Charles Willis and his wife Mary. He was educated at Tonbridge School before going up to Brasenose College, Oxford in 1844 at the age of 17. He moved to Corpus Christi College where he was resident between 1845 and 1853, graduating in 1849 and gaining his MA in 1851. He was a Fellow of the college between 1853 and 1857.

== Cricket ==
Willis played at university, making his debut for Oxford University in 1847. He appeared in three University Matches, the 1847, 1848 and 1849 fixtures, and was a "useful bowler". He played in three matches for the Gentlemen of Kent, one in 1847 and two in 1850, and made a single appearance for Kent County Cricket Club in the later season, a fixture against an All England team, played at School Field, Cranbrook. In his ten matches Willis took 53 wickets, including taking eight wickets in an innings for Oxford against Marylebone Cricket Club (MCC) at Lord's in 1848 and seven in an innings in the same season's University Match.

== Professional career ==
Willis was ordained in the Church of England in 1853, taking up the position of curate at Aldbourne in Wiltshire. He served as rector of Letcombe Bassett in Berkshire between 1857 and 1876 before moving to occupy the same position at Church Brampton in Northamptonshire until 1879. Willis' final ecclesiasticial position was as rector of Bassingham in Lincolnshire where he served from 1879 until his death in 1895 at the age of 68.

In 1847 Willis married Rose Cleather at Hungerford in Berkshire. The couple had six children, four daughters and two sons. His elder brother, William Macbean Willis, also matriculated at Brasenose and was ordained in 1851. He served as curate at Hythe and Horsmonden in Kent before being killed in a railway accident in 1854. (Note: CricketArchive notes Henry Willis, who was born in 1844 at Sydenham in Kent, as his brother. This appears to not be the case and is an error.)

== Bibliography ==
- Carlaw, Derek (2020). Kent County Cricketers, A to Z: Part One (1806–1914) (PDF). Cardiff: ACS.
