= Dulwich Prep & Senior =

Dulwich Prep & Senior (DPS)

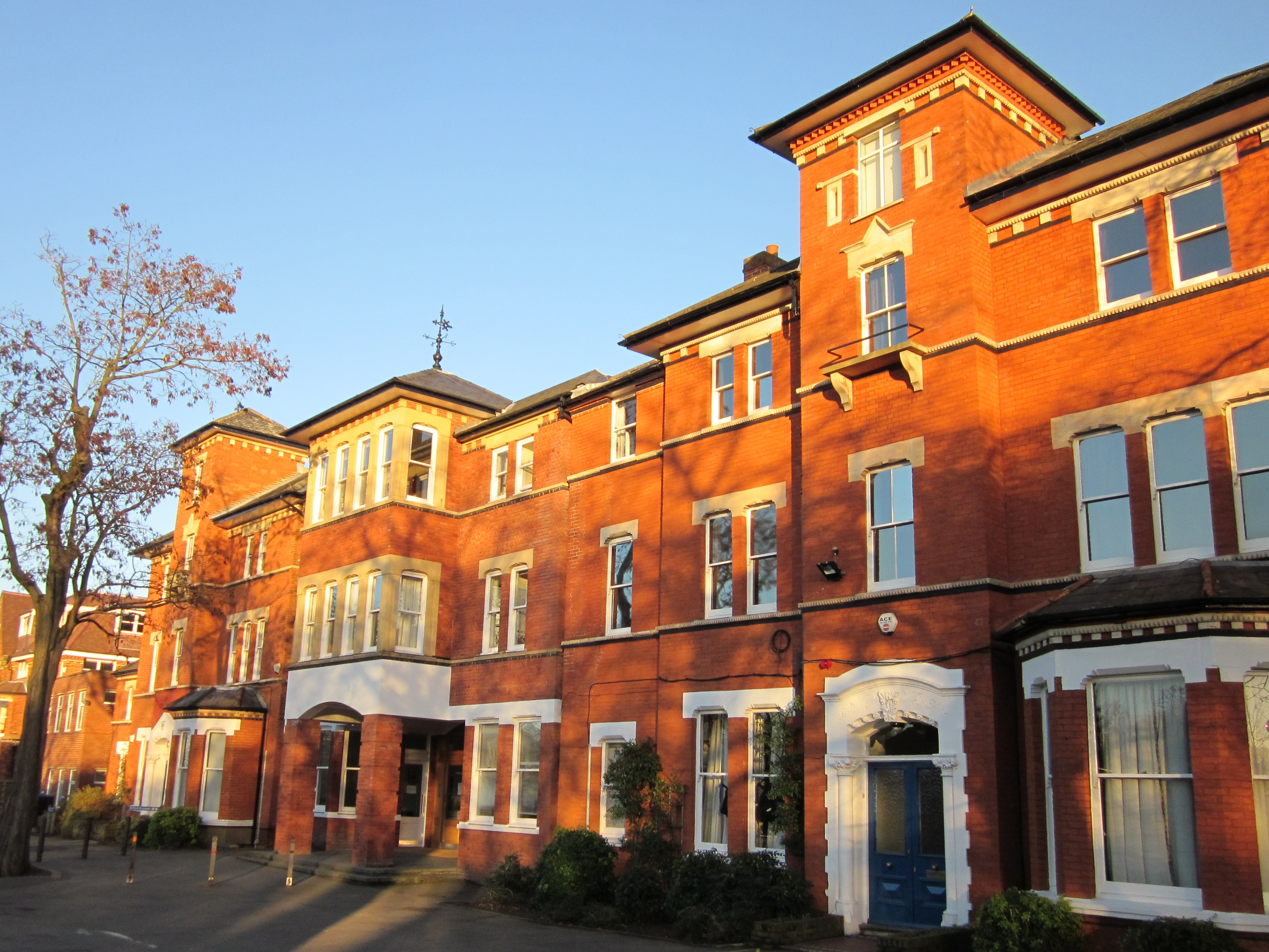

Location
- 38-42 Alleyn Park; London, SE21 7AA; England; 51.4342°N 0.0852°W

Information
- Type: Independent school Preparatory school Senior school
- Religious affiliation: Church of England
- Established: 18 January 1885; 141 years ago
- Founder: Thomas Mason
- Local authority: Southwark
- Department for Education URN: 100862 Tables
- Head Master: Louise Davidson
- Gender: Boys
- Age: 2 to 16
- Houses: Gryphon, Lammasu, Pegasus, Phoenix
- Publication: Focus
- Website: https://dulwichprepsenior.org.uk/

Dulwich Prep & Senior (DPS), formerly known as Dulwich Prep London (2011–2024) and Dulwich College Preparatory School (1885–2011), is an independent school in Dulwich, south London, England for boys aged 2–16 years, with a co-educational Nursery.

== History ==
=== 1885—1893 ===
At the suggestion of the Master of Dulwich College, Thomas Mason founded Dulwich College Preparatory School (DCPS) on 18 January 1885, initially enrolling 13 pupils. The school was originally situated near the site now occupied by the Alleyn’s Head pub. In 1893, it relocated to its present premises.

In 1916, the school introduced a house system, referred to as “tribes.” Each house was named after a Native American tribe and identified by a distinctive colour. The houses were as follows:

- Chippeway (red)
- Deerfeet (blue)
- Objiwas (yellow)
- Mohicans (green)

Deerfeet was an exception in that it was named after Deerfoot, rather than directly after a tribe.

In 2024, Dulwich Prep & Senior introduced a new house system based on legendary creatures, in which Chippeway, Deerfeet, Ojibwas and Mohicans became Phoenix, Lamassu, Gryphon and Pegasus respectively.

=== 1938—1945 ===
In 1938 headmaster John Leakey established an evacuation camp in the orchard on his father-in-law's land at Coursehorn, near Cranbrook, Kent, where the affiliated Dulwich Cranbrook still is today. Due to risk of invasion, the school moved to Betws-y-Coed and stayed there for the rest of the war.

In 1941, the original site of the school was bombed.

=== 1957—present ===
The school became a Charitable Education Trust in 1957. Since then the school gained more land and new buildings were built.

The school celebrated its centenary in 1985 with a Centenary Day on Friday 7 June 1985.

In 2005, a book titled Dulwich and Beyond: A History of Dulwich College Preparatory School written by Neil Smith was published in 2005. It covers the complete history of the school at the time of publication.

As of September 2024, the school renamed itself Dulwich Prep & Senior for the upcoming senior school.
