= Chilworth =

Chilworth may refer to:

- Chilworth, Hampshire
- Chilworth, Surrey
- Chilworth railway station in Chilworth, Surrey
- Chilworth, Cranbrook, a listed building
- Chilworth nature reserve, Beecroft, New South Wales
