= Listed buildings in Cranbrook and Sissinghurst =

Historic structures in Kent, England

Cranbrook, is a town and Sissinghurst is a village in the civil parish of Cranbrook and Sissinghurst in the Borough of Tunbridge Wells of Kent, England. It contains six grade I, 17 grade II* and 294 grade II listed buildings that are recorded in the National Heritage List for England.

This list is based on the information retrieved online from Historic England

== Key ==
| Grade | Criteria |
|---|---|
| I | Buildings that are of exceptional interest |
| II* | Particularly important buildings of more than special interest |
| II | Buildings that are of special interest |

== Listing ==
| Name | Grade | Location | Type | Completed (Note: The date given is the date used by Historic England as significant for the initial building or that of an important part in the structure's description.) | Date designated | Grid ref. (Note: The grid reference is based on the British national grid reference system, sometimes known as OSGB36, used by the Ordnance Survey.) Geo-coordinates | Notes | Entry number (Note: The "List Entry Number" is a unique number assigned to each listed building and scheduled monument by Historic England.) | Image | Wikidata |
|---|---|---|---|---|---|---|---|---|---|---|
| Barn at Goddard's Green Farm | II | Angley Road | E10 | | 19 May 1986 | TQ7677835827; 51°05′40″N 0°31′23″E | | 1084184 | Upload Photo | Q26367771 |
| Cranbrook War Memorial | II | Angley Road | | | 19 May 1986 | TQ7681235740; 51°05′37″N 0°31′25″E | | 1346268 | Upload Photo | Q26629833 |
| Forge Cottage | II | Angley Road | | | 19 May 1986 | TQ7789337022; 51°06′18″N 0°32′23″E | | 1346270 | Upload Photo | Q26685340 |
| Goddards Green Farmhouse | II* | Angley Road | | | 9 June 1952 | TQ7671035799; 51°05′39″N 0°31′20″E | | 1084183 | Upload Photo | Q17547277 |
| The Coach House | II | Angley Road | | | 19 May 1986 | TQ7778836918; 51°06′14″N 0°32′17″E | | 1084187 | Upload Photo | Q26367775 |
| Wilsley Hotel | II* | Angley Road | | | 20 June 1967 | TQ7784736943; 51°06′15″N 0°32′20″E | | 1346269 | Upload Photo | Q17547785 |
| Providence Cottages | II | 1 and 3, Angley Road | | | 6 September 1985 | TQ7770936829; 51°06′12″N 0°32′13″E | | 1084185 | Upload Photo | Q26367772 |
| Wilsley Farmhouse | II | 1 and 2, Angley Road | | | 19 May 1986 | TQ7782337000; 51°06′17″N 0°32′19″E | | 1084186 | Upload Photo | Q26367774 |
| Baker's Cross House | II | Bakers Cross, Baker's Cross | | | 19 May 1986 | TQ7810635803; 51°05′38″N 0°32′31″E | | 1099201 | Upload Photo | Q26391351 |
| Crest Cottage | II | Bakers Cross, Baker's Cross | | | 20 June 1967 | TQ7796535899; 51°05′41″N 0°32′24″E | | 1349030 | Upload Photo | Q26632353 |
| Little Baker's Cross | II | Bakers Cross, Baker's Cross | | | 20 June 1967 | TQ7807335827; 51°05′39″N 0°32′30″E | | 1084190 | Upload Photo | Q26367780 |
| Pear Tree Cottage | II | Bakers Cross, Baker's Cross | | | 20 June 1967 | TQ7797435900; 51°05′41″N 0°32′25″E | | 1346271 | Upload Photo | Q26629835 |
| Rammells House | II | Bakers Cross, Baker's Cross | | | 19 May 1986 | TQ7793435872; 51°05′40″N 0°32′23″E | | 1349034 | Upload Photo | Q26632357 |
| 1 and 2, Bakers Cross | II | 1 and 2, Bakers Cross, Baker's Cross | | | 20 June 1967 | TQ7792635907; 51°05′42″N 0°32′22″E | | 1099228 | Upload Photo | Q26391382 |
| 3, 4 and 5, Bakers Cross | II | 3, 4 and 5, Bakers Cross, Baker's Cross | | | 20 June 1967 | TQ7793935904; 51°05′41″N 0°32′23″E | | 1084188 | Upload Photo | Q26367777 |
| 6 and 7, Bakers Cross | II | 6 and 7, Bakers Cross, Baker's Cross | | | 20 June 1967 | TQ7795635900; 51°05′41″N 0°32′24″E | | 1084189 | Upload Photo | Q26367778 |
| Farningham Farmhouse | II | Benenden Road | | | 20 June 1967 | TQ8052135494; 51°05′25″N 0°34′35″E | | 1349057 | Upload Photo | Q26632380 |
| House to North West of Farningham Oast | II | Benenden Road | | | 19 May 1986 | TQ8045135483; 51°05′25″N 0°34′31″E | | 1084159 | Upload Photo | Q26367737 |
| Whistler's | II | Benenden Road | | | 19 May 1986 | TQ7989336147; 51°05′47″N 0°34′04″E | | 1346272 | Upload Photo | Q26629836 |
| Barn 10 Yards North of Branden | II | Biddenden Road | | | 19 May 1986 | TQ8063737271; 51°06′23″N 0°34′44″E | | 1084162 | Upload Photo | Q26367741 |
| Branden | II | Biddenden Road | | | 20 June 1967 | TQ8063637253; 51°06′22″N 0°34′44″E | | 1084161 | Upload Photo | Q26367740 |
| Chimney Cottage | II | Biddenden Road | | | 19 May 1986 | TQ8266138669; 51°07′05″N 0°36′31″E | | 1084160 | Upload Photo | Q26367738 |
| Plummer's Farmhouse | II | Biddenden Road, Sissinghurst | | | 20 June 1967 | TQ7976537584; 51°06′34″N 0°34′00″E | | 1346287 | Upload Photo | Q26629849 |
| Three Chimneys House | II | Biddenden Road | | | 19 May 1986 | TQ8263538610; 51°07′04″N 0°36′29″E | | 1346284 | Upload Photo | Q26629848 |
| Three Chimneys Public House | II | Biddenden Road | | | 20 June 1967 | TQ8263138772; 51°07′09″N 0°36′29″E | | 1346283 | Upload Photo | Q26629847 |
| Tower and Walls 30 Yards East of the West Range at Sissinghurst Castle | I | Biddenden Road, Sissinghurst | | | 9 June 1952 | TQ8080538315; 51°06′56″N 0°34′55″E | | 1084163 | Tower and Walls 30 Yards East of the West Range at Sissinghurst Castle More images | Q17530338 |
| West Range at Sissinghurst Castle | I | Biddenden Road, Sissinghurst | | | 9 June 1952 | TQ8077638324; 51°06′56″N 0°34′53″E | | 1346285 | West Range at Sissinghurst Castle More images | Q17524695 |
| Barn 60 Yards North of the West Range of Sissinghurst Castle | I | Biddenden Road, Sissinghurst | | | 20 June 1967 | TQ8077438400; 51°06′59″N 0°34′53″E | | 1099119 | Barn 60 Yards North of the West Range of Sissinghurst Castle More images | Q17530354 |
| The Priest's House at Sissinghurst Castle | II* | Biddenden Road | | | 20 June 1967 | TQ8081638363; 51°06′58″N 0°34′55″E | | 1346286 | The Priest's House at Sissinghurst Castle More images | Q17547789 |
| Oast and Roundels 80 Yards North West of the West Range of Sissinghurst Castle | II | Biddenden Road, Sissinghurst | | | 19 May 1986 | TQ8073738384; 51°06′58″N 0°34′51″E | | 1084165 | Oast and Roundels 80 Yards North West of the West Range of Sissinghurst Castle More images | Q26367743 |
| The South Cottage | II* | Biddenden Road, Sissinghurst | | | 20 June 1967 | TQ8084238283; 51°06′55″N 0°34′56″E | | 1084164 | The South Cottage More images | Q17547271 |
| Sissinghurst Castle Farmhouse | II | Biddenden Road, Sissinghurst | | | 19 May 1986 | TQ8067638285; 51°06′55″N 0°34′48″E | | 1099125 | Sissinghurst Castle Farmhouse More images | Q26391279 |
| 3-4, Bridge Buildings | II | 3-4, Bridge Buildings, Stone Street, Cranbrook, TN17 3HG | | | 19 May 1986 | TQ7775236009; 51°05′45″N 0°32′14″E | | 1336932 | Upload Photo | Q26621395 |
| Little Nut Hall | II | Camden Hill, Sissinghurst | | | 19 May 1986 | TQ7904238667; 51°07′10″N 0°33′25″E | | 1349074 | Upload Photo | Q26632396 |
| My Lady's Cottage | II | Camden Hill, Sissinghurst | | | 19 May 1986 | TQ7899338652; 51°07′09″N 0°33′22″E | | 1084167 | Upload Photo | Q26367746 |
| North Cottage | II | Camden Hill, Sissinghurst | | | 19 May 1986 | TQ7918739063; 51°07′22″N 0°33′33″E | | 1084166 | Upload Photo | Q26367744 |
| Saunder's Farmhouse | II | Camden Hill, Sissinghurst | | | 19 May 1986 | TQ7898339231; 51°07′28″N 0°33′23″E | | 1349071 | Upload Photo | Q26632393 |
| Beeman Family Tomb 10 Yards South of Church of St Dunstan | II | Carriers Road | | | 19 May 1986 | TQ7770236156; 51°05′50″N 0°32′11″E | | 1100273 | Upload Photo | Q26392361 |
| Chest Tomb 12 Yards East of Church of St Dunstan | II | Carriers Road | | | 19 May 1986 | TQ7772636177; 51°05′50″N 0°32′13″E | | 1084174 | Upload Photo | Q26367757 |
| Chest Tomb 15 Yards North of Church of St Dunstan | II | Carriers Road | | | 19 May 1986 | TQ7769236194; 51°05′51″N 0°32′11″E | | 1100245 | Upload Photo | Q26392331 |
| Chest Tomb 15 Yards North of Church of St Dunstan | II | Carriers Road | | | 19 May 1986 | TQ7769236193; 51°05′51″N 0°32′11″E | | 1084178 | Upload Photo | Q26367763 |
| Chest Tomb 20 Yards East of Church of St Dunstan | II | Carriers Road | | | 19 May 1986 | TQ7772636187; 51°05′51″N 0°32′13″E | | 1099923 | Upload Photo | Q26392032 |
| Chest Tomb 20 Yards East of Church of St Dunstan | II | Carriers Road | | | 19 May 1986 | TQ7772836183; 51°05′51″N 0°32′13″E | | 1099919 | Upload Photo | Q26392028 |
| Chest Tomb 20 Yards East of Church of St Dunstan | II | Carriers Road | | | 19 May 1986 | TQ7772736185; 51°05′51″N 0°32′13″E | | 1084173 | Upload Photo | Q26367755 |
| Chest Tomb 20 Yards East of Church of St Dunstan | II | Carriers Road | | | 19 May 1986 | TQ7773036178; 51°05′51″N 0°32′13″E | | 1084172 | Upload Photo | Q26367754 |
| Chest Tomb 20 Yards North of Church of St Dunstan | II | Carriers Road | | | 19 May 1986 | TQ7769636198; 51°05′51″N 0°32′11″E | | 1346291 | Upload Photo | Q26629853 |
| Chest Tomb 25 Yards East of Church of St Dunstan | II | Carriers Road | | | 19 May 1986 | TQ7772936193; 51°05′51″N 0°32′13″E | | 1099948 | Upload Photo | Q26392055 |
| Chest Tomb 25 Yards East of Church of St Dunstan | II | Carriers Road | | | 19 May 1986 | TQ7773336187; 51°05′51″N 0°32′13″E | | 1084170 | Upload Photo | Q26367751 |
| Chest Tomb 25 Yards East of Church of St Dunstan | II | Carriers Road | | | 19 May 1986 | TQ7773636180; 51°05′51″N 0°32′13″E | | 1099916 | Upload Photo | Q26392025 |
| Chest Tomb 25 Yards South of Church of St Dunstan | II | Carriers Road | | | 19 May 1986 | TQ7768136132; 51°05′49″N 0°32′10″E | | 1099896 | Upload Photo | Q26392004 |
| Chest Tomb 30 Yards North of Church of St Dunstan | II | Carriers Road | | | 19 May 1986 | TQ7768936205; 51°05′51″N 0°32′11″E | | 1100252 | Upload Photo | Q26392339 |
| Chest Tomb 30 Yards South East of Church of St Dunstan | II | Carriers Road | | | 19 May 1986 | TQ7774336168; 51°05′50″N 0°32′13″E | | 1084171 | Upload Photo | Q26367752 |
| Chest Tomb 35 Yards North of Church of St Dunstan | II | Carriers Road | | | 19 May 1986 | TQ7769536212; 51°05′52″N 0°32′11″E | | 1084179 | Upload Photo | Q26367764 |
| Chest Tomb 35 Yards South West of Church of St Dunstan | II | Carriers Road | | | 19 May 1986 | TQ7764736128; 51°05′49″N 0°32′08″E | | 1346290 | Upload Photo | Q26685346 |
| Chest Tomb 35 Yards South West of Church of St Dunstan | II | Carriers Road | | | 19 May 1986 | TQ7764636129; 51°05′49″N 0°32′08″E | | 1100241 | Upload Photo | Q26392328 |
| Chest Tomb 35 Yards South West of Church of St Dunstan | II | Carriers Road | | | 19 May 1986 | TQ7765936128; 51°05′49″N 0°32′09″E | | 1084176 | Upload Photo | Q26367760 |
| Chest Tomb 35 Yards South West of Church of St Dunstan | II | Carriers Road | | | 19 May 1986 | TQ7764736126; 51°05′49″N 0°32′08″E | | 1084177 | Upload Photo | Q26367761 |
| Chest Tomb 35 Yards South West of Church of St Dunstan | II | Carriers Road | | | 19 May 1986 | TQ7764836125; 51°05′49″N 0°32′09″E | | 1348542 | Upload Photo | Q26893597 |
| Chest Tomb 45 Yards North of Church of St Dunstan | II | Carriers Road | | | 19 May 1986 | TQ7769136227; 51°05′52″N 0°32′11″E | | 1100256 | Upload Photo | Q26392343 |
| Chest Tomb 5 Yards North East of Church of St Dunstan | II | Carriers Road | | | 19 May 1986 | TQ7771036185; 51°05′51″N 0°32′12″E | | 1346292 | Upload Photo | Q26685348 |
| Chest Tomb 5 Yards North East of Church of St Dunstan | II | Carriers Road | | | 19 May 1986 | TQ7771036182; 51°05′51″N 0°32′12″E | | 1084180 | Upload Photo | Q26367766 |
| Chest Tomb 5 Yards North East of Church of St Dunstan | II | Carriers Road | | | 19 May 1986 | TQ7771036184; 51°05′51″N 0°32′12″E | | 1100626 | Upload Photo | Q26393132 |
| Chest Tomb 7 Yards South East of Church of St Dunstan | II | Carriers Road | | | 19 May 1986 | TQ7772036168; 51°05′50″N 0°32′12″E | | 1346288 | Upload Photo | Q26685344 |
| Chest Tomb 7 Yards South East of Church of St Dunstan | II | Carriers Road | | | 19 May 1986 | TQ7772036169; 51°05′50″N 0°32′12″E | | 1099928 | Upload Photo | Q26392037 |
| Chest Tomb 7 Yards South of Church of St Dunstan | II | Carriers Road | | | 19 May 1986 | TQ7771236155; 51°05′50″N 0°32′12″E | | 1084175 | Upload Photo | Q26367758 |
| Chest Tomb 7 Yards South of Church of St Dunstan | II | Carriers Road | | | 19 May 1986 | TQ7771236156; 51°05′50″N 0°32′12″E | | 1099894 | Upload Photo | Q26392002 |
| Church of St Dunstan | I | Carriers Road | | | 20 June 1967 | TQ7768936169; 51°05′50″N 0°32′11″E | | 1099931 | Upload Photo | Q17530358 |
| Courthope Chest Tomb 3 Yards South of Church of St Dunstan | II | Carriers Road | | | 19 May 1986 | TQ7770136158; 51°05′50″N 0°32′11″E | | 1346289 | Upload Photo | Q26629851 |
| Cranbrook Museum | II | Carriers Road | | | 20 June 1967 | TQ7753736187; 51°05′51″N 0°32′03″E | | 1084168 | Upload Photo | Q26367747 |
| The Church House | II | Carriers Road | | | 20 June 1967 | TQ7771936140; 51°05′49″N 0°32′12″E | | 1336921 | Upload Photo | Q26621385 |
| The Moat | II | Carriers Road | | | 20 June 1967 | TQ7751936154; 51°05′50″N 0°32′02″E | | 1099096 | Upload Photo | Q26391254 |
| Roberts Monument | II | 35 Yards North East Of Church Of St Dunstan, Carriers Road | | | 19 May 1986 | TQ7773036210; 51°05′52″N 0°32′13″E | | 1084169 | Upload Photo | Q26367749 |
| Barn 25 Yards North of Collier's Green Farmhouse | II | Collier's Green Road | | | 19 May 1986 | TQ7596838540; 51°07′09″N 0°30′46″E | | 1084867 | Upload Photo | Q26369531 |
| Collier's Green Farmhouse | II | Collier's Green Road | | | 19 May 1986 | TQ7597138508; 51°07′08″N 0°30′47″E | | 1084866 | Upload Photo | Q26369526 |
| Hazelden | II | Collier's Green Road | | | 19 May 1986 | TQ7674238463; 51°07′06″N 0°31′26″E | | 1084865 | Upload Photo | Q26369521 |
| Steddenden | II | Collier's Green Road | | | 19 May 1986 | TQ7670638478; 51°07′06″N 0°31′24″E | | 1336923 | Upload Photo | Q26621387 |
| April Cottage | II | 1, Common Road | | | 19 May 1986 | TQ7929437542; 51°06′33″N 0°33′36″E | | 1067782 | Upload Photo | Q26320579 |
| Carpenter's Corner | II | 1 and 2, Common Road | | | 20 June 1967 | TQ7901637999; 51°06′48″N 0°33′22″E | | 1336924 | Upload Photo | Q26621388 |
| Barn 50 Yards South of Coursehorn | II | Coursehorn Lane | | | 19 May 1986 | TQ7931035800; 51°05′37″N 0°33′33″E | | 1100597 | Upload Photo | Q26393075 |
| Coursehorn | II* | Coursehorn Lane | | | 20 June 1967 | TQ7925835826; 51°05′37″N 0°33′31″E | | 1336925 | Upload Photo | Q17547719 |
| Little Coursehorn | II | Coursehorn Lane | | | 20 June 1967 | TQ7954534992; 51°05′10″N 0°33′44″E | | 1336926 | Upload Photo | Q26621389 |
| Oast and Granary 40 Yards South of Coursehorn | II | Coursehorn Lane | | | 19 May 1986 | TQ7926035782; 51°05′36″N 0°33′31″E | | 1084869 | Upload Photo | Q26369536 |
| Oast House 25 Yards East of Little Coursehorn | II | Coursehorn Lane | | | 19 May 1986 | TQ7959235011; 51°05′11″N 0°33′46″E | | 1101558 | Upload Photo | Q26395115 |
| The Old Barn | II | Coursehorn Lane | | | 22 March 1988 | TQ7900335662; 51°05′32″N 0°33′17″E | | 1338666 | Upload Photo | Q26622967 |
| The Old Cloth Hall | II* | Coursehorn Lane | | | 9 June 1952 | TQ7910235728; 51°05′34″N 0°33′23″E | | 1084868 | Upload Photo | Q17547355 |
| Weaver's End | II | Coursehorn Lane | | | 19 May 1986 | TQ7917935691; 51°05′33″N 0°33′26″E | | 1101553 | Upload Photo | Q26395103 |
| Roadside Cottage | II | Cranbrook, TN17 2LX | | | 19 May 1986 | TQ7777540047; 51°07′56″N 0°32′22″E | | 1356155 | Upload Photo | Q26638848 |
| Stream Cottage | II | Cranbrook, TN17 2LX | | | 25 September 2015 | TQ7777040044; 51°07′55″N 0°32′22″E | | 1429398 | Upload Photo | Q26677530 |
| Barn 30 Yards South of Hawkridge Farmhouse | II | Cranbrook & Sissinghurst, Cranbrook Common | | | 19 May 1986 | TQ7852138336; 51°06′59″N 0°32′57″E | | 1084872 | Upload Photo | Q26369552 |
| Beryl Cottage | II | Cranbrook & Sissinghurst, Wilsley Green | | | 20 June 1967 | TQ7794037084; 51°06′20″N 0°32′25″E | | 1049082 | Upload Photo | Q26301137 |
| Bettenham Manor and Oast to the West | II* | Cranbrook & Sissinghurst, Three Chimneys, Sissinghurst | | | 20 June 1967 | TQ8169239118; 51°07′21″N 0°35′42″E | | 1338661 | Upload Photo | Q17547734 |
| Bounds End Farmhouse | II | Cranbrook & Sissinghurst, Collier's Green | | | 19 May 1986 | TQ7704340261; 51°08′03″N 0°31′45″E | | 1084863 | Upload Photo | Q26369511 |
| Bowling Green Cottage | II | Cranbrook & Sissinghurst | | | 19 May 1986 | TQ7769636426; 51°05′59″N 0°32′12″E | | 1084181 | Upload Photo | Q26367767 |
| Broomfield | II | Cranbrook & Sissinghurst, Collier's Green | | | 19 May 1986 | TQ7582938690; 51°07′14″N 0°30′40″E | | 1336922 | Upload Photo | Q26621386 |
| Crossways | II | Cranbrook & Sissinghurst, Wilsley Pound | | | 9 June 1952 | TQ7829137490; 51°06′32″N 0°32′44″E | | 1084795 | Upload Photo | Q26369186 |
| Furnace Farmhouse | II | Cranbrook & Sissinghurst | | | 20 June 1967 | TQ7393334867; 51°05′12″N 0°28′56″E | | 1084182 | Upload Photo | Q26367769 |
| Hawkridge Farmhouse | II | Cranbrook & Sissinghurst, Cranbrook Common | | | 19 May 1986 | TQ7855038358; 51°07′00″N 0°32′59″E | | 1101514 | Upload Photo | Q26395017 |
| Hayselden Manor | II | Cranbrook & Sissinghurst, Cranbrook Common | | | 19 May 1986 | TQ7890138338; 51°06′59″N 0°33′17″E | | 1336927 | Upload Photo | Q26621390 |
| Hazleden Cottage | II | Cranbrook & Sissinghurst, Cranbrook Common | | | 20 June 1967 | TQ7893838462; 51°07′03″N 0°33′19″E | | 1347898 | Upload Photo | Q26631319 |
| Kennel Holt Country House Hotel | II | Cranbrook & Sissinghurst | | | 20 February 1991 | TQ7677637721; 51°06′41″N 0°31′27″E | | 1253278 | Upload Photo | Q26545046 |
| Little Bettenham | II | Cranbrook & Sissinghurst, Three Chimneys, Sissinghurst | | | 20 June 1967 | TQ8240439025; 51°07′17″N 0°36′18″E | | 1084785 | Upload Photo | Q26369132 |
| Little Park Farmhouse | II | Cranbrook & Sissinghurst, Collier's Green | | | 19 May 1986 | TQ7600139183; 51°07′30″N 0°30′49″E | | 1084864 | Upload Photo | Q26369516 |
| Mockbeggar House | II | Cranbrook & Sissinghurst, Wilsley Green | | | 20 June 1967 | TQ7800037129; 51°06′21″N 0°32′28″E | | 1084793 | Upload Photo | Q26369176 |
| Oast Cottage | II | Cranbrook & Sissinghurst, Wilsley Pound | | | 19 May 1986 | TQ7830937512; 51°06′33″N 0°32′45″E | | 1049068 | Upload Photo | Q26301123 |
| Old Mill Cottage | II | Cranbrook & Sissinghurst, Flishinghurst | | | 20 February 1991 | TQ7650737079; 51°06′21″N 0°31′12″E | | 1084800 | Upload Photo | Q26369206 |
| Rose Cottage and Oak Cottage | II | Cranbrook & Sissinghurst, Wilsley Green | | | 20 June 1967 | TQ7795037089; 51°06′20″N 0°32′26″E | | 1084794 | Upload Photo | Q26369181 |
| Sissinghurst Park | II | Cranbrook & Sissinghurst, Cranbrook Common | | | 19 May 1986 | TQ7785139128; 51°07′26″N 0°32′24″E | | 1084870 | Upload Photo | Q26369542 |
| Staddleden | II | Cranbrook & Sissinghurst, Cranbrook Common | | | 19 May 1986 | TQ7853838930; 51°07′19″N 0°32′59″E | | 1101538 | Upload Photo | Q26395064 |
| The Old Barracks | II | Cranbrook & Sissinghurst, Wilsley Pound | | | 9 June 1952 | TQ7816737333; 51°06′27″N 0°32′37″E | | 1049063 | Upload Photo | Q26301118 |
| Tomb of Lady Sanderson in the Grounds of My Lady's Cottage | II | Cranbrook & Sissinghurst, Cranbrook Common | | | 5 November 1990 | TQ7901338631; 51°07′08″N 0°33′23″E | | 1253275 | Upload Photo | Q26545043 |
| Mount Pleasant | II | Cranbrook Common | | | 19 May 1986 | TQ7900038495; 51°07′04″N 0°33′22″E | | 1084871 | Upload Photo | Q26369546 |
| The Wendy House | II | Everndens, Stone Street, Cranbrook, TN17 3HF | | | 19 May 1986 | TQ7772436041; 51°05′46″N 0°32′12″E | | 1084805 | Upload Photo | Q26369232 |
| The Freight | II | Freight Lane | | | 9 June 1952 | TQ7758435118; 51°05′16″N 0°32′03″E | | 1084873 | Upload Photo | Q26369557 |
| Friezley and Weavers | II* | Friezley Lane | | | 9 June 1952 | TQ7743238209; 51°06′57″N 0°32′01″E | | 1347912 | Upload Photo | Q17547829 |
| Letterbox Cottage | II | Friezley Lane | | | 19 May 1986 | TQ7732837959; 51°06′49″N 0°31′55″E | | 1347910 | Upload Photo | Q26631331 |
| Little Friezley | II | Friezley Lane | | | 19 May 1986 | TQ7741138129; 51°06′54″N 0°32′00″E | | 1084874 | Upload Photo | Q26369563 |
| The Pest House | II | Frythe Walk | | | 20 June 1967 | TQ7756935653; 51°05′34″N 0°32′04″E | | 1084875 | Upload Photo | Q26369569 |
| Angley Farm Cottages | II | Glassenbury Road | | | 19 May 1986 | TQ7539335858; 51°05′43″N 0°30′12″E | | 1084877 | Upload Photo | Q26369579 |
| Angley Farmhouse | II | Glassenbury Road | | | 19 May 1986 | TQ7545035852; 51°05′42″N 0°30′15″E | | 1347943 | Upload Photo | Q26631363 |
| Barn 50 Yards North of Bull Farmhouse | II | Glassenbury Road | | | 20 June 1967 | TQ7583034693; 51°05′05″N 0°30′33″E | | 1084876 | Upload Photo | Q26369574 |
| Bull Farmhouse | II | Glassenbury Road | | | 20 June 1967 | TQ7583434666; 51°05′04″N 0°30′33″E | | 1101480 | Upload Photo | Q26394948 |
| Forge Farmhouse | II | Glassenbury Road | | | 19 May 1986 | TQ7503336759; 51°06′12″N 0°29′55″E | | 1084880 | Upload Photo | Q26369596 |
| Glassenbury Cottage | II | Glassenbury Road | | | 19 May 1986 | TQ7494636253; 51°05′56″N 0°29′50″E | | 1101488 | Upload Photo | Q26394962 |
| Glassenbury Hill Farmhouse | II | Glassenbury Road | | | 19 May 1986 | TQ7497236609; 51°06′07″N 0°29′52″E | | 1084879 | Upload Photo | Q26369591 |
| Glassenbury Park House | II* | Glassenbury Road | | | 27 January 1977 | TQ7470836648; 51°06′09″N 0°29′38″E | | 1101470 | Upload Photo | Q17547384 |
| Little Glassenbury | II | Glassenbury Road | | | 20 June 1967 | TQ7442936479; 51°06′04″N 0°29′24″E | | 1084878 | Upload Photo | Q26369586 |
| Little Swallows | II | Golford Road | | | 19 May 1986 | TQ7883336522; 51°06′00″N 0°33′10″E | | 1084881 | Upload Photo | Q26369602 |
| Paddock's Farmhouse | II | Golford Road | | | 19 May 1986 | TQ7876635956; 51°05′42″N 0°33′06″E | | 1101796 | Upload Photo | Q26395604 |
| Starling's Cottage | II | Golford Road | | | 19 May 1986 | TQ7968036338; 51°05′53″N 0°33′53″E | | 1347783 | Upload Photo | Q26631211 |
| Stream Farmhouse | II | Golford Road | | | 19 May 1986 | TQ7929536199; 51°05′49″N 0°33′33″E | | 1336890 | Upload Photo | Q26621355 |
| Weaver's | II | Golford Road | | | 19 May 1986 | TQ7952536298; 51°05′52″N 0°33′45″E | | 1347760 | Upload Photo | Q26631190 |
| Barn 30 Yards North West of Four Wents Farmhouse | II | Goudhurst Road | | | 19 May 1986 | TQ7529337619; 51°06′40″N 0°30′10″E | | 1101774 | Upload Photo | Q26395562 |
| Barn 35 Yards East of Manor Farmhouse | II | Goudhurst Road | | | 19 May 1986 | TQ7592637714; 51°06′42″N 0°30′43″E | | 1084842 | Upload Photo | Q26369398 |
| Dogkennel Farmhouse | II | Goudhurst Road | | | 19 May 1986 | TQ7676237802; 51°06′44″N 0°31′26″E | | 1084843 | Upload Photo | Q26369403 |
| Dower House Cottage | II | Goudhurst Road | | | 19 May 1986 | TQ7568937583; 51°06′38″N 0°30′30″E | | 1336892 | Upload Photo | Q26621357 |
| Flishinghurst House | II | Goudhurst Road | | | 9 June 1952 | TQ7567637565; 51°06′38″N 0°30′30″E | | 1084883 | Upload Photo | Q26369613 |
| Four Wents Farmhouse | II | Goudhurst Road | | | 19 May 1986 | TQ7531037601; 51°06′39″N 0°30′11″E | | 1101762 | Upload Photo | Q26395540 |
| Manor Farmhouse | II | Goudhurst Road | | | 19 May 1986 | TQ7588937684; 51°06′41″N 0°30′41″E | | 1101737 | Upload Photo | Q26395489 |
| North Lodge and Gates to Angley Park | II | Goudhurst Road | | | 19 May 1986 | TQ7747837803; 51°06′43″N 0°32′03″E | | 1084844 | Upload Photo | Q26369408 |
| Oast and Granary 25 Yards West of Four Wents Farmhouse | II | Goudhurst Road | | | 19 May 1986 | TQ7529437559; 51°06′38″N 0°30′10″E | | 1084882 | Upload Photo | Q26369607 |
| White Cottage | II | Goudhurst Road | | | 20 June 1967 | TQ7613337733; 51°06′43″N 0°30′54″E | | 1336911 | Upload Photo | Q26621376 |
| Four Wents Cottages | II | Gouldhurst Road | | | 19 May 1986 | TQ7526337554; 51°06′38″N 0°30′09″E | | 1336891 | Upload Photo | Q26621356 |
| Hartley Farmhouse | II | Hartley Road | | | 19 May 1986 | TQ7602534753; 51°05′06″N 0°30′43″E | | 1336913 | Upload Photo | Q26621378 |
| Hartley Gate Farmhouse | II | Hartley Road | | | 19 May 1986 | TQ7595834741; 51°05′06″N 0°30′39″E | | 1084847 | Upload Photo | Q26369424 |
| Hartley House | II | Hartley Road | | | 19 May 1986 | TQ7612035043; 51°05′16″N 0°30′48″E | | 1084846 | Upload Photo | Q26369420 |
| The Cottage | II | Hartley Road | | | 19 May 1986 | TQ7679035684; 51°05′36″N 0°31′24″E | | 1336912 | Upload Photo | Q26685022 |
| Hall Wood Farmhouse | II | Hawkhurst Road | | | 20 June 1967 | TQ7536734310; 51°04′53″N 0°30′08″E | | 1084397 | Upload Photo | Q26368053 |
| Hartley House | II | Hawkhurst Road | | | 19 May 1986 | TQ7582234599; 51°05′02″N 0°30′32″E | | 1336914 | Upload Photo | Q26685024 |
| Turk's Place | II | Hawkhurst Road | | | 19 May 1986 | TQ7595234310; 51°04′52″N 0°30′38″E | | 1084848 | Upload Photo | Q26369430 |
| Hill Cottages | II | 1 and 2, Hawkhurst Road | | | 19 May 1986 | TQ7582834575; 51°05′01″N 0°30′32″E | | 1084395 | Upload Photo | Q26368050 |
| Arnewood | II | High Street | | | 19 May 1986 | TQ7735335951; 51°05′44″N 0°31′53″E | | 1084855 | Upload Photo | Q26369468 |
| Bay Tree Cottage | II | High Street | | | 20 June 1967 | TQ7748436007; 51°05′45″N 0°32′00″E | | 1336917 | Upload Photo | Q26621382 |
| Beemans | II | High Street | | | 19 May 1986 | TQ7715235872; 51°05′41″N 0°31′43″E | | 1068545 | Upload Photo | Q26321251 |
| Bell House Fabrics and Interiors and Butler House Carpets | II | High Street, Cranbrook, TN17 3DN | | | 20 June 1967 | TQ7750136012; 51°05′45″N 0°32′01″E | | 1084369 | Upload Photo | Q26368017 |
| Briar Cottage | II | High Street | | | 20 June 1967 | TQ7722235929; 51°05′43″N 0°31′46″E | | 1336918 | Upload Photo | Q26621383 |
| Broad Cloth | II | High Street | | | 9 June 1952 | TQ7739735966; 51°05′44″N 0°31′55″E | | 1084853 | Upload Photo | Q26369458 |
| Causton Cottage | II | High Street | | | 20 June 1967 | TQ7737635993; 51°05′45″N 0°31′54″E | | 1338639 | Upload Photo | Q26622943 |
| Chilworth | II | High Street | | | 19 May 1986 | TQ7718035882; 51°05′42″N 0°31′44″E | | 1084858 | Upload Photo | Q26369484 |
| Clermont | II | High Street | | | 19 May 1986 | TQ7754436027; 51°05′46″N 0°32′03″E | | 1084394 | Upload Photo | Q26368049 |
| Congregational Church | II | High Street | | | 19 May 1986 | TQ7757336039; 51°05′46″N 0°32′05″E | | 1084384 | Upload Photo | Q26368034 |
| Corn Hall Farmhouse | II | High Street | | | 19 May 1986 | TQ7723335864; 51°05′41″N 0°31′47″E | | 1084857 | Upload Photo | Q26369479 |
| Cranbrook Do It Yourself Shop | II | High Street | | | 20 June 1967 | TQ7754936060; 51°05′47″N 0°32′03″E | | 1068623 | Upload Photo | Q26321323 |
| Crane Books | II | High Street | | | 19 May 1986 | TQ7756636037; 51°05′46″N 0°32′04″E | | 1084850 | Upload Photo | Q26369441 |
| Cranehurst | II | High Street | | | 19 May 1986 | TQ7721735892; 51°05′42″N 0°31′46″E | | 1357576 | Upload Photo | Q26640085 |
| Crown Cottage | II | High Street | | | 20 June 1967 | TQ7745636024; 51°05′46″N 0°31′59″E | | 1338640 | Upload Photo | Q26622944 |
| Elm Cottage | II | High Street | | | 19 May 1986 | TQ7736435992; 51°05′45″N 0°31′54″E | | 1084862 | Upload Photo | Q26369504 |
| George Cottage | II | High Street | | | 19 May 1986 | TQ7762836077; 51°05′47″N 0°32′07″E | | 1084404 | Upload Photo | Q26368063 |
| High House | II | High Street | | | 20 June 1967 | TQ7726235945; 51°05′43″N 0°31′48″E | | 1068555 | Upload Photo | Q26321261 |
| Jasmine Villa and 53-55 | II | High Street, Cranbrook, TN17 3EE | | | 19 May 1986 | TQ7751436042; 51°05′46″N 0°32′02″E | | 1084826 | Upload Photo | Q26369327 |
| John's Cottage | II | High Street | | | 19 May 1986 | TQ7735935993; 51°05′45″N 0°31′53″E | | 1068570 | Upload Photo | Q26321275 |
| Jones Fishmonger | II | High Street | | | 19 May 1986 | TQ7759036081; 51°05′48″N 0°32′05″E | | 1084829 | Upload Photo | Q26369338 |
| Kent Cottage | II | High Street | | | 19 May 1986 | TQ7736235956; 51°05′44″N 0°31′54″E | | 1084854 | Upload Photo | Q26369463 |
| King's Bakers | II | High Street | | | 19 May 1986 | TQ7760236087; 51°05′48″N 0°32′06″E | | 1338644 | Upload Photo | Q26622948 |
| Laurel Cottage | II | High Street | | | 20 June 1967 | TQ7740635973; 51°05′44″N 0°31′56″E | | 1063711 | Upload Photo | Q26317006 |
| Little Shepherds | II | High Street | | | 20 June 1967 | TQ7729235960; 51°05′44″N 0°31′50″E | | 1068563 | Upload Photo | Q26321268 |
| Lloyd's Bank | II | High Street | | | 9 June 1952 | TQ7752636020; 51°05′46″N 0°32′02″E | | 1084851 | Upload Photo | Q26369447 |
| May Cottage | II | High Street | | | 19 May 1986 | TQ7723335933; 51°05′43″N 0°31′47″E | | 1366290 | Upload Photo | Q26647896 |
| Midland Bank | II | High Street | | | 7 May 1963 | TQ7756136067; 51°05′47″N 0°32′04″E | | 1338643 | Upload Photo | Q26622947 |
| Millstone Dress Shop | II | High Street | | | 19 May 1986 | TQ7763336081; 51°05′47″N 0°32′08″E | | 1336915 | Upload Photo | Q26621380 |
| Napier Cottage | II | High Street | | | 19 May 1986 | TQ7727035921; 51°05′43″N 0°31′49″E | | 1065718 | Upload Photo | Q26318763 |
| Old Cottage | II | High Street | | | 20 June 1967 | TQ7737035956; 51°05′44″N 0°31′54″E | | 1065695 | Upload Photo | Q26318743 |
| Orphirvilla | II | High Street | | | 19 May 1986 | TQ7724735939; 51°05′43″N 0°31′48″E | | 1336919 | Upload Photo | Q26621384 |
| Page's Tobacconists | II | High Street | | | 19 May 1986 | TQ7758536079; 51°05′47″N 0°32′05″E | | 1084828 | Upload Photo | Q26369333 |
| Penfolds | II | High Street | | | 19 May 1986 | TQ7725135941; 51°05′43″N 0°31′48″E | | 1068553 | Upload Photo | Q26321259 |
| Shepherds | II* | High Street | | | 9 June 1952 | TQ7732535994; 51°05′45″N 0°31′52″E | | 1336920 | Upload Photo | Q17547714 |
| Susan Dean Gifts | II | High Street | | | 20 June 1967 | TQ7765036111; 51°05′48″N 0°32′09″E | | 1084830 | Upload Photo | Q26369344 |
| The Abbey | II | High Street | | | 20 June 1967 | TQ7731835932; 51°05′43″N 0°31′51″E | | 1084856 | Upload Photo | Q26369474 |
| The Cottage | II | High Street | | | 19 May 1986 | TQ7725635943; 51°05′43″N 0°31′48″E | | 1084860 | Upload Photo | Q26369496 |
| The Cranbrook Bakery | II | High Street, Cranbrook, TN17 3EJ | | | 19 May 1986 | TQ7747836030; 51°05′46″N 0°32′00″E | | 1338641 | Upload Photo | Q26622945 |
| The Crown Public House | II | High Street | | | 20 June 1967 | TQ7744536023; 51°05′46″N 0°31′58″E | | 1084823 | Upload Photo | Q26369313 |
| Thyme Cottage | II | High Street | | | 19 May 1986 | TQ7724035936; 51°05′43″N 0°31′47″E | | 1084859 | Upload Photo | Q26369489 |
| Tiffins Place and Little Tudor | II | High Street, Cranbrook, TN17 3EN | | | 19 May 1986 | TQ7727835951; 51°05′44″N 0°31′49″E | | 1084861 | Upload Photo | Q26369500 |
| Webster House and Railings to North | II | High Street | | | 19 May 1986 | TQ7734435948; 51°05′43″N 0°31′53″E | | 1357564 | Upload Photo | Q26640074 |
| White Lion House | II | High Street, Cranbrook, TN17 3DF | | | 19 May 1986 | TQ7761836064; 51°05′47″N 0°32′07″E | | 1084849 | Upload Photo | Q26369435 |
| Belle Vue Cottages | II | 1-3, High Street | | | 11 December 1979 | TQ7747236003; 51°05′45″N 0°31′59″E | | 1338862 | Upload Photo | Q26623150 |
| Lyndhurst Cottages | II | 1-3, High Street | | | 20 June 1967 | TQ7743835991; 51°05′45″N 0°31′58″E | | 1084852 | Upload Photo | Q26369452 |
| 3-11, High Street | II | 3-11, High Street, Cranbrook, TN17 3EB | | | 19 May 1986 | TQ7761636094; 51°05′48″N 0°32′07″E | | 1068644 | Upload Photo | Q26321344 |
| 17, High Street | II | 17, High Street, Cranbrook, TN17 3EE | | | 19 May 1986 | TQ7759636084; 51°05′48″N 0°32′06″E | | 1356159 | Upload Photo | Q26638852 |
| 25-31, High Street | II | 25-31, High Street, Cranbrook, TN17 3EE | | | 19 May 1986 | TQ7757436072; 51°05′47″N 0°32′05″E | | 1068633 | Upload Photo | Q26321334 |
| 35-39, High Street | II | 35-39, High Street | | | 20 June 1967 | TQ7755636032; 51°05′46″N 0°32′04″E | | 1336916 | Upload Photo | Q26621381 |
| 43-47, High Street | II* | 43-47, High Street, Cranbrook, TN17 3EE | | | 20 June 1967 | TQ7753736053; 51°05′47″N 0°32′03″E | | 1084827 | Upload Photo | Q17547343 |
| 57, High Street | II | 57, High Street | | | 19 May 1986 | TQ7749936037; 51°05′46″N 0°32′01″E | | 1084825 | Upload Photo | Q26369323 |
| 65-67, High Street | II | 65-67, High Street | | | 20 June 1967 | TQ7746736028; 51°05′46″N 0°31′59″E | | 1084824 | Upload Photo | Q26369317 |
| 75, High Street | II | 75, High Street | | | 20 June 1967 | TQ7743336016; 51°05′46″N 0°31′57″E | | 1084822 | Upload Photo | Q26369306 |
| Yawtons | II | London Lane | | | 20 June 1967 | TQ7926238879; 51°07′16″N 0°33′36″E | | 1084835 | Upload Photo | Q26369363 |
| Number 1 | II | Middle House And Mercers Cottage, 1, Wilsley Green | | | 20 June 1967 | TQ7796737106; 51°06′20″N 0°32′27″E | | 1049131 | Upload Photo | Q26301184 |
| Mill Cottage | II | Mill Lane, Sissinghurst | | | 19 May 1986 | TQ7875837762; 51°06′41″N 0°33′08″E | | 1068706 | Upload Photo | Q26321403 |
| Barn 100 Yards West of Hartridge Manor | II | Paley Lane | | | 19 May 1986 | TQ7738739839; 51°07′49″N 0°32′02″E | | 1356153 | Upload Photo | Q26638846 |
| Hartridge Manor | II | Paley Lane | | | 9 June 1952 | TQ7747039831; 51°07′49″N 0°32′06″E | | 1084836 | Upload Photo | Q26369368 |
| Paley Mill Farmhouse | II | Paley Lane | | | 19 May 1986 | TQ7757340107; 51°07′58″N 0°32′12″E | | 1338646 | Upload Photo | Q26622950 |
| Badgers Oak Farmhouse | II | Park Lane | | | 19 May 1986 | TQ7550833508; 51°04′27″N 0°30′14″E | | 1356124 | Upload Photo | Q26638819 |
| Eggshell Cottage | II | Park Lane | | | 19 May 1986 | TQ7530433433; 51°04′24″N 0°30′03″E | | 1084837 | Upload Photo | Q26369373 |
| 1-4, Quaker Lane | II | 1-4, Quaker Lane | | | 19 May 1986 | TQ7766836774; 51°06′10″N 0°32′11″E | | 1084838 | Upload Photo | Q26369379 |
| Strict Baptist Chapel | II | Saint David's Bridge | | | 20 June 1967 | TQ7780235950; 51°05′43″N 0°32′16″E | | 1068779 | Upload Photo | Q2494309 |
| The Smithy | II | Saint David's Bridge | | | 19 May 1986 | TQ7778736000; 51°05′45″N 0°32′15″E | | 1338647 | Upload Photo | Q26622951 |
| 1, Saint David's Bridge | II | 1, Saint David's Bridge | | | 19 May 1986 | TQ7779135996; 51°05′45″N 0°32′16″E | | 1084839 | Upload Photo | Q26369383 |
| Copthall Cottages | II | 1-3, Saint David's Bridge | | | 19 May 1986 | TQ7781835967; 51°05′44″N 0°32′17″E | | 1336909 | Upload Photo | Q26621374 |
| 2 and 3, Saint David's Bridge | II | 2 and 3, Saint David's Bridge | | | 19 May 1986 | TQ7779835992; 51°05′44″N 0°32′16″E | | 1068771 | Upload Photo | Q26321465 |
| Thompson | II | Snell And Passmore, Solicitors, High Street | | | 19 May 1986 | TQ7752736048; 51°05′47″N 0°32′02″E | | 1338642 | Upload Photo | Q26622946 |
| Forge House | II | St Davids Bridge | | | 20 June 1967 | TQ7778336007; 51°05′45″N 0°32′15″E | | 1356135 | Upload Photo | Q26638830 |
| The Old Bakery | II | St David's Bridge | | | 19 May 1986 | TQ7779235964; 51°05′44″N 0°32′16″E | | 1068794 | Upload Photo | Q26321489 |
| Albert House and Shipmans | II | Stone Street, Cranbrook, TN17 3HG | | | 20 June 1967 | TQ7773936015; 51°05′45″N 0°32′13″E | | 1343656 | Upload Photo | Q26627439 |
| Anderson and Sons Butchers and George Hotel | II* | Stone Street, Cranbrook, TN17 3HE | | | 9 June 1952 | TQ7765136078; 51°05′47″N 0°32′09″E | | 1075155 | Upload Photo | Q17547177 |
| Bird-in-hand-cottage | II | Stone Street | | | 20 June 1967 | TQ7776836034; 51°05′46″N 0°32′15″E | | 1084806 | Upload Photo | Q26369238 |
| Bridge Conachar Bookshop | II | Stone Street | | | 19 May 1986 | TQ7775836003; 51°05′45″N 0°32′14″E | | 1343655 | Upload Photo | Q26627438 |
| Burgage Plot Cottage 10 Yards to North of Brown's Architects Office | II | Stone Street | | | 19 May 1986 | TQ7772636050; 51°05′46″N 0°32′12″E | | 1084803 | Upload Photo | Q26369222 |
| Burgage Plot Cottage 15 Yards to North Brown's Architects Office | II | Stone Street | | | 19 May 1986 | TQ7773136056; 51°05′47″N 0°32′13″E | | 1336930 | Upload Photo | Q26621393 |
| Cranbrook Engineering Works | II | Stone Street, Cranbrook, TN17 3HB | | | 28 May 2015 | TQ7765436048; 51°05′46″N 0°32′09″E | | 1426361 | Upload Photo | Q26677286 |
| Iris Hairdressers | II | Stone Street | | | 19 May 1986 | TQ7773736037; 51°05′46″N 0°32′13″E | | 1336931 | Upload Photo | Q26621394 |
| Jean French Shoe Shop | II | Stone Street | | | 19 May 1986 | TQ7767936047; 51°05′46″N 0°32′10″E | | 1084809 | Upload Photo | Q26369249 |
| Kerry's Greengrocers | II | Stone Street | | | 20 June 1967 | TQ7766736102; 51°05′48″N 0°32′09″E | | 1084840 | Upload Photo | Q26369389 |
| Maitland's Outfitters | II | Stone Street | | | 19 May 1986 | TQ7770236057; 51°05′47″N 0°32′11″E | | 1084802 | Upload Photo | Q26369217 |
| Norman Holmes Jewellers | II | Stone Street | | | 19 May 1986 | TQ7771836044; 51°05′46″N 0°32′12″E | | 1084804 | Upload Photo | Q26369228 |
| Old Printers House | II | Stone Street, Cranbrook, TN17 3HF | | | 20 June 1967 | TQ7771336048; 51°05′46″N 0°32′12″E | | 1336929 | Upload Photo | Q26621392 |
| Perfect Partner's Delicatessen | II | Stone Street | | | 20 June 1967 | TQ7767436099; 51°05′48″N 0°32′10″E | | 1356112 | Upload Photo | Q26638808 |
| Providence Chapel | II* | Stone Street | | | 9 June 1967 | TQ7767836008; 51°05′45″N 0°32′10″E | | 1084808 | Upload Photo | Q17547322 |
| The Cloudberry Restaurant | II | Stone Street, Cranbrook, TN17 3HE | | | 19 May 1986 | TQ7770536030; 51°05′46″N 0°32′11″E | | 1068878 | Upload Photo | Q26321570 |
| Vestry Hall | II | Stone Street | | | 19 May 1986 | TQ7767636118; 51°05′49″N 0°32′10″E | | 1336910 | Upload Photo | Q26621375 |
| White's News Agents | II | Stone Street | | | 19 May 1986 | TQ7770036035; 51°05′46″N 0°32′11″E | | 1336933 | Upload Photo | Q26621396 |
| 9, Stone Street | II | 9, Stone Street, Cranbrook, TN17 3HF | | | 19 May 1986 | TQ7767836092; 51°05′48″N 0°32′10″E | | 1084841 | Upload Photo | Q26369393 |
| 11-13, Stone Street | II | 11-13, Stone Street, Cranbrook, TN17 3HF | | | 19 May 1986 | TQ7767736083; 51°05′47″N 0°32′10″E | | 1068837 | Upload Photo | Q26321530 |
| 15, Stone Street | II | 15, Stone Street | | | 19 May 1986 | TQ7768336075; 51°05′47″N 0°32′10″E | | 1336928 | Upload Photo | Q26621391 |
| 17 and 19, Stone Street | II | 17 and 19, Stone Street, Cranbrook, TN17 3HF | | | 19 May 1986 | TQ7769636063; 51°05′47″N 0°32′11″E | | 1084801 | Upload Photo | Q26369211 |
| 20, Stone Street | II | 20, Stone Street, Cranbrook, TN17 3HE | | | 19 May 1986 | TQ7768436044; 51°05′46″N 0°32′10″E | | 1343625 | Upload Photo | Q26627409 |
| 21-27, Stone Street | II | 21-27, Stone Street, Cranbrook, TN17 3HF | | | 7 May 1963 | TQ7772036025; 51°05′46″N 0°32′12″E | | 1084807 | Upload Photo | Q26369244 |
| Barn 20 Yards South East of Charity Farmhouse | II | Swattenden Lane | | | 19 May 1986 | TQ7672834387; 51°04′54″N 0°31′18″E | | 1077001 | Upload Photo | Q26343096 |
| Charity Farmhouse | II | Swattenden Lane | | | 19 May 1986 | TQ7672234422; 51°04′55″N 0°31′18″E | | 1084819 | Upload Photo | Q26369290 |
| Little Charity | II | Swattenden Lane | | | 19 May 1986 | TQ7677934438; 51°04′55″N 0°31′21″E | | 1077000 | Upload Photo | Q26343093 |
| Oast and Granary 20 Yards West of Charity Farmhouse | II | Swattenden Lane | | | 19 May 1986 | TQ7669734425; 51°04′55″N 0°31′17″E | | 1084820 | Upload Photo | Q26369296 |
| Pricklegate Farmhouse | II | Swattenden Lane | | | 19 May 1986 | TQ7799834464; 51°04′55″N 0°32′24″E | | 1336936 | Upload Photo | Q26621399 |
| Cottage to Rear of Morte's Tobacconists and Cranbrook Antiques | II | Tanyard Passage | | | 19 May 1986 | TQ7770636022; 51°05′45″N 0°32′11″E | | 1077005 | Upload Photo | Q26343111 |
| The Cottage | II | Tanyard Passage | | | 19 May 1986 | TQ7770436016; 51°05′45″N 0°32′11″E | | 1084821 | Upload Photo | Q26369304 |
| Golford Cottage | II | Tenterden Road, Sissinghurst | | | 19 May 1986 | TQ8000336597; 51°06′02″N 0°34′10″E | | 1084781 | Upload Photo | Q26369109 |
| Golford Gate | II | Tenterden Road, Sissinghurst | | | 19 May 1986 | TQ7981836518; 51°05′59″N 0°34′01″E | | 1338660 | Upload Photo | Q26622963 |
| Golford Place | II | Tenterden Road, Sissinghurst | | | 19 May 1986 | TQ8024136602; 51°06′01″N 0°34′23″E | | 1084782 | Upload Photo | Q26369115 |
| Little Golford | II | Tenterden Road, Sissinghurst | | | 20 June 1967 | TQ7999736548; 51°06′00″N 0°34′10″E | | 1338659 | Upload Photo | Q26622962 |
| Oasthouse 20 Yards to North West of Little Golford | II | Tenterden Road, Sissinghurst | | | 20 June 1967 | TQ7998636565; 51°06′00″N 0°34′09″E | | 1084783 | Upload Photo | Q26369121 |
| The Oast | II | Tenterden Road, Sissinghurst | | | 19 May 1986 | TQ7980536515; 51°05′59″N 0°34′00″E | | 1084784 | Upload Photo | Q26369127 |
| Wentways and Laylocks | II | Tenterden Road, Sissinghurst | | | 19 May 1986 | TQ7979336586; 51°06′01″N 0°34′00″E | | 1342725 | Upload Photo | Q26626669 |
| Mouse Hall | II | The Common, Sissinghurst, Cranbrook, TN17 2AD | | | 19 May 1986 | TQ7884937974; 51°06′47″N 0°33′14″E | | 1336889 | Upload Photo | Q26621354 |
| The Crossways | II | The Crossways, Sissinghurst | | | 19 May 1986 | TQ7896938012; 51°06′48″N 0°33′20″E | | 1101522 | Upload Photo | Q26395030 |
| Ashleigh | II | The Hill | | | 20 June 1967 | TQ7790435890; 51°05′41″N 0°32′21″E | | 1084832 | Upload Photo | Q26369353 |
| Glebe Cottage | II | The Hill | | | 20 June 1967 | TQ7782235934; 51°05′43″N 0°32′17″E | | 1068699 | Upload Photo | Q26321396 |
| Grey Cottages | II | The Hill | | | 19 May 1986 | TQ7790335916; 51°05′42″N 0°32′21″E | | 1084831 | Upload Photo | Q26369348 |
| Hill House | II* | The Hill | | | 9 June 1952 | TQ7786135906; 51°05′42″N 0°32′19″E | | 1084833 | Upload Photo | Q17547350 |
| Hill Side Cottage | II | The Hill | | | 19 May 1986 | TQ7782735929; 51°05′42″N 0°32′17″E | | 1084834 | Upload Photo | Q26369357 |
| Jenner Cottages | II | The Hill | | | 20 June 1967 | TQ7791235913; 51°05′42″N 0°32′22″E | | 1068685 | Upload Photo | Q26321383 |
| Mill Cottage | II | The Hill | | | 19 May 1986 | TQ7788635928; 51°05′42″N 0°32′20″E | | 1338645 | Upload Photo | Q26685067 |
| Mill View | II | The Hill | | | 20 June 1967 | TQ7787635900; 51°05′41″N 0°32′20″E | | 1356143 | Upload Photo | Q26638836 |
| Union Mill | I | The Hill, Cranbrook | | | 9 June 1952 | TQ7790635948; 51°05′43″N 0°32′21″E | | 1356175 | Upload Photo | Q3958453 |
| Borough Cottages | II | 2 and 3, The Hill | | | 19 May 1986 | TQ7785135951; 51°05′43″N 0°32′19″E | | 1068667 | Upload Photo | Q26321365 |
| At Last | II | The Street, Sissinghurst | | | 19 May 1986 | TQ7943537523; 51°06′32″N 0°33′43″E | | 1067791 | Upload Photo | Q26320587 |
| Bell Cottage | II* | The Street, Sissinghurst | | | 20 June 1967 | TQ7941637524; 51°06′32″N 0°33′42″E | | 1084811 | Upload Photo | Q17547331 |
| Church House | II | The Street, Sissinghurst | | | 20 June 1967 | TQ7955437498; 51°06′31″N 0°33′49″E | | 1084818 | Upload Photo | Q26369285 |
| Church of the Holy Trinity | II | The Street, Sissinghurst | | | 19 May 1986 | TQ7954637536; 51°06′32″N 0°33′49″E | | 1356540 | Upload Photo | Q26639187 |
| Collins Farmhouse | II | The Street, Sissinghurst | | | 20 June 1967 | TQ7935937542; 51°06′33″N 0°33′39″E | | 1084813 | Upload Photo | Q26369263 |
| Forge Cottage | II | The Street, Sissinghurst | | | 20 June 1967 | TQ7934637531; 51°06′32″N 0°33′38″E | | 1067799 | Upload Photo | Q26320594 |
| Garden Pavilion 60 Yards of Sissinghurst Court | II | The Street, Sissinghurst | | | 19 May 1986 | TQ7889237316; 51°06′26″N 0°33′15″E | | 1084816 | Upload Photo | Q26369274 |
| Gatehouse Farmhouse | II | The Street, Sissinghurst | | | 20 June 1967 | TQ7902237484; 51°06′31″N 0°33′22″E | | 1356594 | Upload Photo | Q26639234 |
| Hazelhurst Cottage | II | The Street, Sissinghurst | | | 19 May 1986 | TQ7937037494; 51°06′31″N 0°33′39″E | | 1067706 | Upload Photo | Q26320505 |
| King's Head House | II* | The Street, Sissinghurst | | | 20 June 1967 | TQ7934037534; 51°06′33″N 0°33′38″E | | 1084814 | Upload Photo | Q17547339 |
| Sissinghurst Court and Entrance Wall | II | The Street, Sissinghurst | | | 19 December 1985 | TQ7888437394; 51°06′29″N 0°33′14″E | | 1067750 | Upload Photo | Q26320547 |
| The Bull Public House | II | The Street, Sissinghurst | | | 19 May 1986 | TQ7947637526; 51°06′32″N 0°33′45″E | | 1084810 | Upload Photo | Q26369253 |
| The Old Vicarage | II | The Street, Sissinghurst | | | 19 May 1986 | TQ7958037555; 51°06′33″N 0°33′50″E | | 1336934 | Upload Photo | Q26621397 |
| Virginia House | II | The Street, Sissinghurst | | | 19 May 1986 | TQ7942437499; 51°06′31″N 0°33′42″E | | 1336935 | Upload Photo | Q26621398 |
| Walnut Trees | II | The Street, Sissinghurst | | | 20 June 1967 | TQ7950337481; 51°06′31″N 0°33′46″E | | 1067721 | Upload Photo | Q26320519 |
| Alpine Cottages | II | 1 and 2, The Street, Sissinghurst | | | 20 June 1967 | TQ7931037511; 51°06′32″N 0°33′36″E | | 1084817 | Upload Photo | Q26369280 |
| Reed's Cottages | II | 1-4, The Street, Sissinghurst | | | 20 June 1967 | TQ7938137524; 51°06′32″N 0°33′40″E | | 1084812 | Upload Photo | Q26369258 |
| Reed's Cottages | II | 5, The Street, Sissinghurst | | | 19 May 1986 | TQ7940437523; 51°06′32″N 0°33′41″E | | 1067793 | Upload Photo | Q26320589 |
| 6, The Street | II | 6, The Street, Sissinghurst | | | 19 May 1986 | TQ7927937540; 51°06′33″N 0°33′35″E | | 1084815 | Upload Photo | Q26369269 |
| Cranbrook Cottage | II | The Tanyard | | | 19 May 1986 | TQ7769835988; 51°05′44″N 0°32′11″E | | 1077002 | Upload Photo | Q26343100 |
| 1 and 2, The Tanyard | II | 1 and 2, The Tanyard | | | 19 May 1986 | TQ7770635993; 51°05′45″N 0°32′11″E | | 1338638 | Upload Photo | Q26622942 |
| Barn 30 Yards to the South East of Dove's Farmhouse | II | Tilsden Lane | | | 19 May 1986 | TQ7828834392; 51°04′52″N 0°32′38″E | | 1084787 | Upload Photo | Q26369145 |
| Dove's Farmhouse | II | Tilsden Lane | | | 19 May 1986 | TQ7824434396; 51°04′52″N 0°32′36″E | | 1338662 | Upload Photo | Q26622964 |
| Hancock's Farmhouse | II | Tilsden Lane | | | 20 June 1967 | TQ7832835433; 51°05′26″N 0°32′42″E | | 1084786 | Upload Photo | Q26369138 |
| Oasthouse and Granary 80 Yards to the South of Dove's Farmhouse | II | Tilsden Lane | | | 19 May 1986 | TQ7827334362; 51°04′51″N 0°32′38″E | | 1372610 | Upload Photo | Q26653710 |
| Tilsden | II | Tilsden Lane | | | 20 June 1967 | TQ7820535145; 51°05′17″N 0°32′35″E | | 1084788 | Upload Photo | Q26369149 |
| 1, Tippens Close | II | 1, Tippens Close | | | 19 May 1986 | TQ7789935885; 51°05′41″N 0°32′21″E | | 1051674 | Upload Photo | Q26303517 |
| 2 and 3, Tippens Close | II | 2 and 3, Tippens Close | | | 19 May 1986 | TQ7789735880; 51°05′41″N 0°32′21″E | | 1084789 | Upload Photo | Q26369156 |
| 4 and 5, Tippens Close | II | 4 and 5, Tippens Close | | | 19 May 1986 | TQ7789035874; 51°05′40″N 0°32′21″E | | 1373842 | Upload Photo | Q26654761 |
| 6a, 6b and 7, Tippens Close | II | 6a, 6b and 7, Tippens Close | | | 19 May 1986 | TQ7790135865; 51°05′40″N 0°32′21″E | | 1084790 | Upload Photo | Q26369160 |
| Trenley's Farmhouse | II | Trenley Lane | | | 19 May 1986 | TQ7519632818; 51°04′05″N 0°29′57″E | | 1049117 | Upload Photo | Q26301170 |
| Huggin's Hall | II | Turnden Road | | | 20 June 1967 | TQ7587735402; 51°05′27″N 0°30′36″E | | 1084791 | Upload Photo | Q26369165 |
| 1, Waterloo Cottage | II | 1, Waterloo Cottage, Waterloo Road, Cranbrook, TN17 3JG | | | 19 May 1986 | TQ7779136015; 51°05′45″N 0°32′16″E | | 1373852 | Upload Photo | Q26654770 |
| 1-6, Waterloo Place | II | 1-6, Waterloo Place, Waterloo Road, Cranbrook, TN17 3JH | | | 19 May 1986 | TQ7795136313; 51°05′55″N 0°32′24″E | | 1084798 | Upload Photo | Q26369196 |
| Cranbrook School House and Walls to South | II* | Waterloo Road | | | 9 June 1952 | TQ7779336070; 51°05′47″N 0°32′16″E | | 1084796 | Upload Photo | Q17547319 |
| Hamilton Cottage and the Spotted Dog | II | Waterloo Road, Cranbrook, TN17 3JJ | | | 19 May 1986 | TQ7791236234; 51°05′52″N 0°32′22″E | | 1049045 | Upload Photo | Q26301099 |
| The Big School | II | Waterloo Road | | | 19 May 1986 | TQ7778936099; 51°05′48″N 0°32′16″E | | 1049039 | Upload Photo | Q26301093 |
| The Old Corn Store | II | Waterloo Road, Cranbrook, TN17 3JQ | | | 19 May 1986 | TQ7784936094; 51°05′48″N 0°32′19″E | | 1084799 | Upload Photo | Q26369201 |
| Workshop 20 Yards to South West of the Bungalow | II | Waterloo Road | | | 19 May 1986 | TQ7787436074; 51°05′47″N 0°32′20″E | | 1373891 | Upload Photo | Q26654807 |
| 2, Waterloo Road | II | 2, Waterloo Road | | | 19 May 1986 | TQ7778336025; 51°05′45″N 0°32′15″E | | 1338664 | Upload Photo | Q26622965 |
| 3, Waterloo Road | II | 3, Waterloo Road | | | 19 May 1986 | TQ7778936027; 51°05′46″N 0°32′16″E | | 1084797 | Upload Photo | Q26369191 |
| 5, Waterloo Road | II | 5, Waterloo Road | | | 19 May 1986 | TQ7779536029; 51°05′46″N 0°32′16″E | | 1373887 | Upload Photo | Q26654803 |
| 7, Waterloo Road | II | 7, Waterloo Road | | | 19 May 1986 | TQ7780036033; 51°05′46″N 0°32′16″E | | 1338665 | Upload Photo | Q26622966 |

== See also ==
- Grade I listed buildings in Kent
- Grade II* listed buildings in Kent

== Sources ==
- Newman, John (2012) [1969], Kent: West and the Weald, The Buildings of England, New Haven and London: Yale University Press, ISBN 978-0-300-18509-6
