= Sissinghurst =

Village in Kent, England

Coordinates: 51.1073°N 0.5634°E

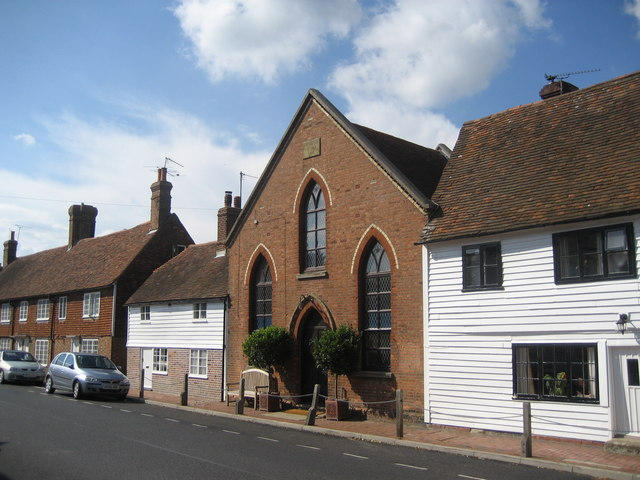
- The Street, Sissinghurst

- Location within Kent
- OS grid reference: TQ795373
- Civil parish: Cranbrook and Sissinghurst
- District: Tunbridge Wells
- Shire county: Kent
- Region: South East
- Country: England
- Sovereign state: United Kingdom
- Post town: CRANBROOK
- Postcode district: TN17
- Dialling code: 01580
- Police: Kent
- Fire: Kent
- Ambulance: South East Coast
- UK Parliament: Weald of Kent

Sissinghurst is a small village in the borough of Tunbridge Wells in Kent, England. Originally called Milkhouse Street (also referred to as Mylkehouse), Sissinghurst changed its name in the 1850s, possibly to avoid association with the smuggling and cockfighting activities of the Hawkhurst Gang. It is in the civil parish of Cranbrook and Sissinghurst.

The nearest railway station is at Staplehurst, 4 miles (6.4 km) to the north.

== Geography ==
Sissinghurst is situated with Cranbrook to the south, Goudhurst to the west, Tenterden to the east and Staplehurst to the north. It sits just back from the A229 which goes from Rochester to Hawkhurst.

== Sissinghurst Castle Garden ==
Sissinghurst's garden was created in the 1930s by Vita Sackville-West, poet and gardening writer, and her husband Harold Nicolson, author and diplomat. Sackville-West was a writer on the fringes of the Bloomsbury group who found her greatest popularity in the weekly columns she contributed as gardening correspondent of The Observer, which incidentally – for she never touted it – made her own garden famous. The garden itself is designed as a series of "rooms", each with a different character of colour and/or theme, divided by high clipped hedges and pink brick walls.

== Trinity Church ==
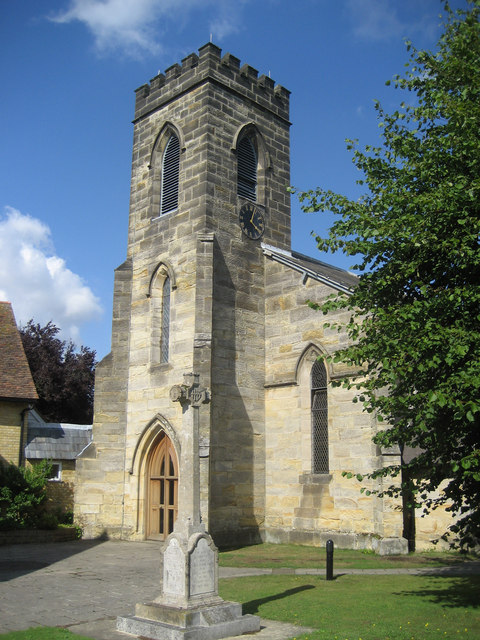
Trinity Church

The Church of England 'Trinity Church' and was built in 1838. It is currently managed by Rev. Pete Deaves who is also Rector of Frittenden.

== People ==
People of note who have lived in Sissinghurst include:

- Sir Richard Baker (c. 1568–1645) a politician, historian and religious writer
- Laurence Drummond (1861–1946) a British Army general officer
- Sir Harold Nicolson (1886–1968) British diplomat, author and politician
- Vita Sackville-West CH (1892–1962) The Hon Lady Nicolson, English poet, novelist and gardener
- Pamela Schwerdt (1931–2009) joint head gardener at Sissinghurst Castle Garden from 1959 to 1990 and a pioneering horticulturalist
- Christopher Lee (1941–2021) a British writer, historian and broadcaster
- Ian Hislop (born 1960) editor of Private Eye and team captain of Have I Got News for You, husband of Victoria Hislop.
- Victoria Hislop (born 1959) novelist and author.

== See also ==
- Listed buildings in Cranbrook and Sissinghurst
