= Cranbrook Strict Baptist Chapel =

Strict Baptist Chapel
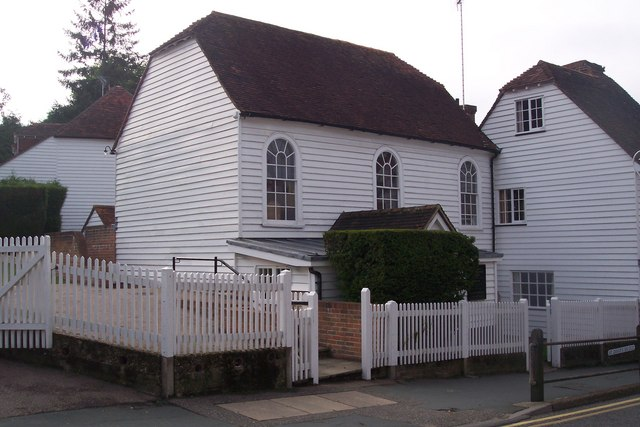
- The chapel
- Strict Baptist Chapel
- 51.0953°N 0.5378°E
- OS grid reference: TQ 77802 35950
- Location: Cranbrook, Kent
- Country: England
- Denomination: Baptist

History
- Status: chapel
- Founded: 1787

Architecture
- Heritage designation: Grade II, ID 1068779
- Completed: 1787

The Cranbrook Strict Baptist Chapel, is a Strict Baptist place of worship in the town of Cranbrook in the English county of Kent. The chapel was built in 1787.

== History ==
There had been a history of Baptists in Cranbrook when the first Baptists arrived from Biddenden in 1648. The area had already been a hotbed for Nonconformists since the puritans during the English Civil War. There had been a big meeting and public debate in Cranbrook that led to a formation of a large Baptist church in Spillshill near Staplehurst during the reign of King Charles I of England.

The Cranbrook Strict Baptist Chapel came about following a split from the General Baptists in Bessels Green, Kent. The Cranbrook Strict Baptist Chapel was created in 1787 following the conversion of a pair of wood panelled cottages into a Strict Baptist chapel. The chapel holds surviving baptismal records from 1682 for those in the Cranbrook area who had not baptised in the Church of England. The chapel provided pastors to help found the local Providence Baptist Church in 1909.

In 1967, the Cranbrook Strict Baptist Chapel was given grade II listed building status by English Heritage. In 2002, the chapel made a submission to the House of Lords' Select Committee on Religious Offences, arguing for the blasphemy law in the United Kingdom to be retained. The chapel was listed by Tunbridge Wells Borough Council among several notable local features, to be a contributory building to Cranbrook's status as a conservation area. The pastor of the Cranbrook Strict Baptist Chapel also joins in the induction of new interdenominational Christian ministers in Cranbrook.

== See also ==
- List of Strict Baptist churches
- List of places of worship in Tunbridge Wells (borough)
