= Chilworth, Cranbrook =

Historic building in Kent, England

Chilworth
- Location within the United Kingdom Location within England Location within Kent
- 51.094866°N 0.528938°E
- Location: Cranbrook, Kent, England

History
- Built: early 19th century

Listed Building – Grade II
- Designated: 19 May 1986
- Reference no.: 1084858

Chilworth is a historic building in Cranbrook, Kent, England. Standing on High Street, it was built in the early 19th century. In 1986, it became a Grade II listed building.
