= Colliers Green =

Village in Kent, England

Coordinates: 51.120350°N 0.512430°E

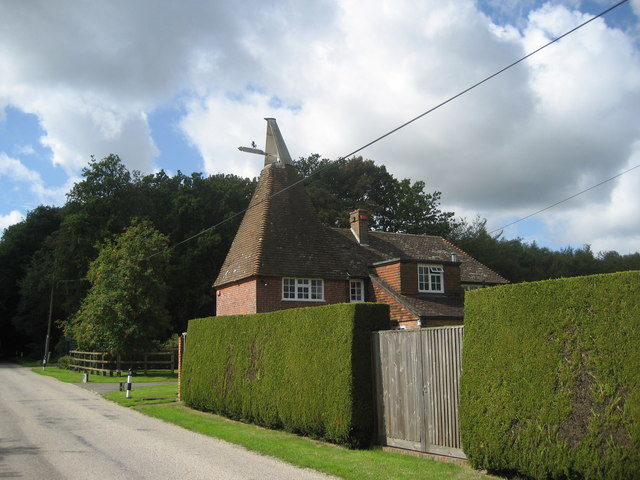
- An oast house on Colliers Green Road

- Location within Kent
- Civil parish: Cranbrook and Sissinghurst
- District: Tunbridge Wells
- Shire county: Kent
- Region: South East
- Country: England
- Sovereign state: United Kingdom
- Post town: Cranbrook
- Postcode district: TN17
- Police: Kent
- Fire: Kent
- Ambulance: South East Coast
- UK Parliament: Weald of Kent

Colliers Green is a hamlet 2 miles (3 km) north of Cranbrook in Kent, England.

Colliers Green School, a Church of England primary school, is located at the centre of the village.
