= High Street, Cranbrook =

Street in Cranbrook, England

High Street
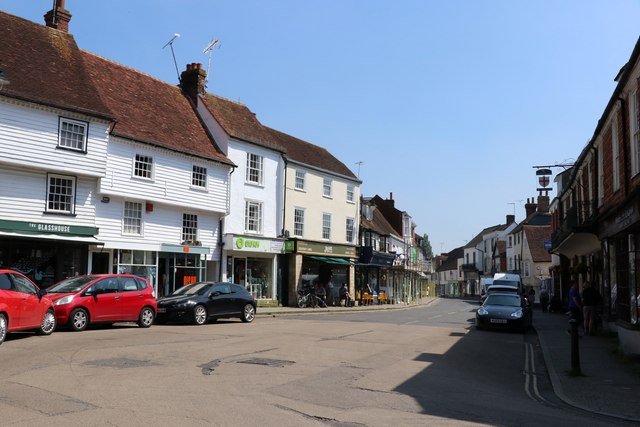
- A 2024 view
- Length: 0.62 mi (1.00 km)
- Location: Cranbrook, Kent, England
- East end: Carriers Road and Stone Street
- West end: Hartley Road

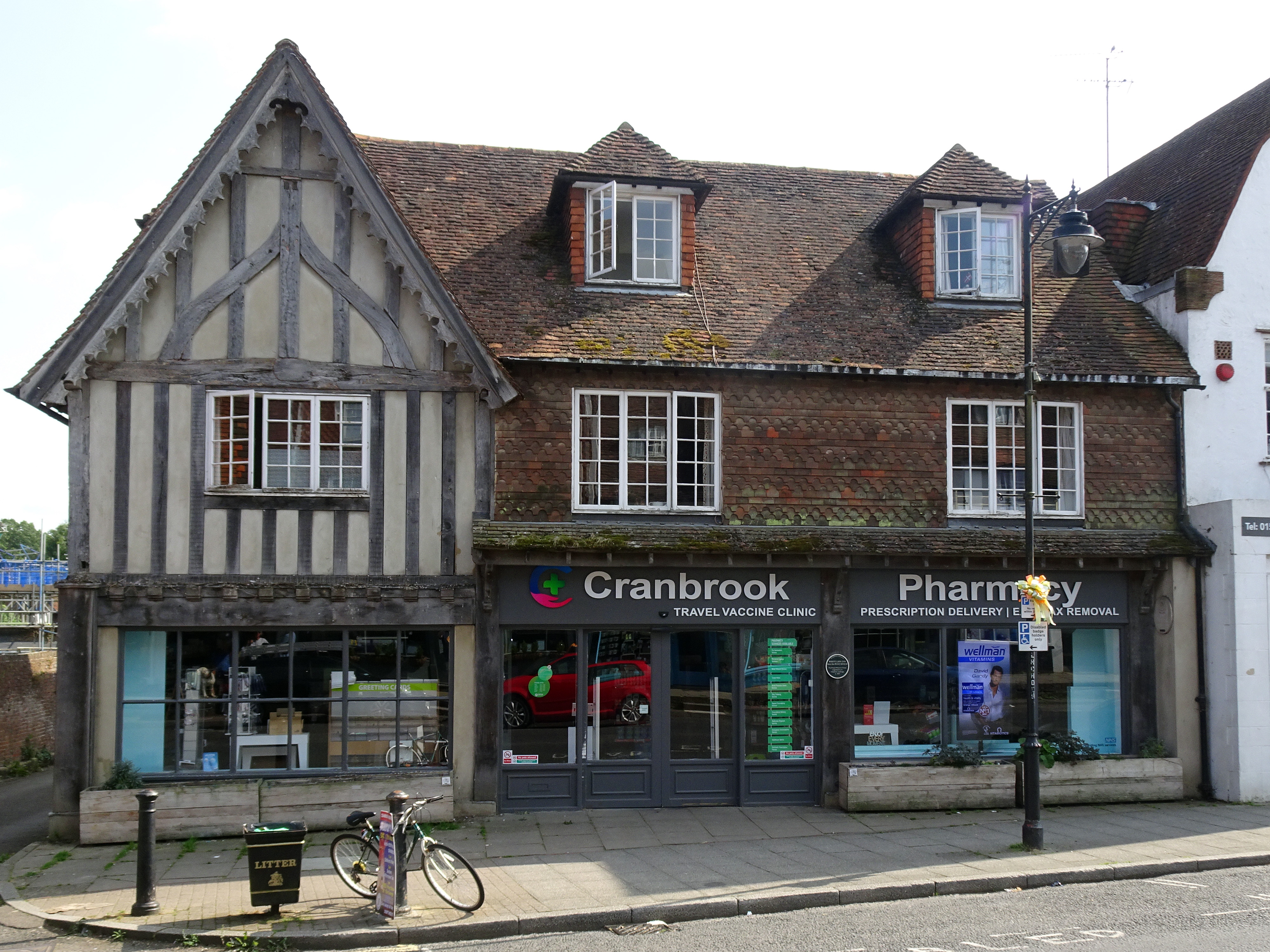
White Lion House, the home of Cranbrook Pharmacy

High Street is the main thoroughfare of the English market town of Cranbrook, Kent. It runs for 0.62 miles (1.00 km), from a merging of Carriers Road and Stone Street in the east to Hartley Road (the A229) in the west. Many of its buildings date to the late-medieval period, with over fifty of them now being listed.

A market has been held in High Street since 1290, when Archbishop Peckham granted the town a charter.

Notable buildings on the northern side of High Street include:

- The Pharmacy and Pharmacy Cottage. The cottage was once part of a range of buildings that have since been demolished
- Chilworth, dating to the 19th century

Artists Frederick Daniel Hardy and Thomas Webster formerly owned a studio on High Street.
