= Swifts Park =

Sports venue in Kent, England

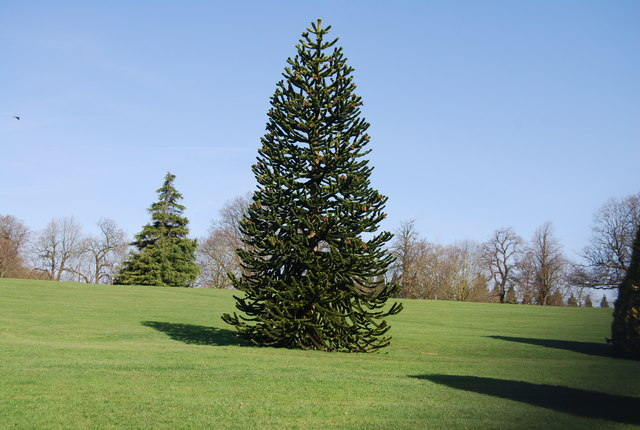
Monkey Puzzle tree on the Swifts Park estate along the High Weald Landscape Trail

Swifts Park is a former country estate and manor house 1 mile (1.6 km) north-east of the town of Cranbrook in the English county of Kent. Through its history, the estate has been variously known by the names Swifts, Great Swift, Great Swifts, and Swifts Place and since 1995 as Oak Hill Manor. At its greatest extent it covered an area of around 158 hectares (390 acres).

An estate has existed at Swifts Park from at least the early 15th century, with the current house having been built in 1937. The grounds held two first-class cricket matches played by Kent County Cricket Club in the 1860s.

== History ==
Swifts Park is believed to have derived its name from the family of Johnathan Swift who owned the estate in the early 14th century. It was purchased in 1447 from Johnathan's descendant, Stephen Swift, by Peter Courthope of Cranbrook, a wealthy member of Kent's Courthorpe family; it remained the property of Peter's descendants into the 17th century. Thereafter, at least by 1678, it was purchased by John Cooke, Chief Prothonotary in the Court of Common Pleas. It remained in Cooke's family until 1784, during which time it was known as Great Swift or Great Swifts, and appears on several maps of the Cranbrook area.

After being purchased by Thomas Adams in 1784 the house was modernised and the estate enlarged before being sold to Major John Austen, a relative of author Jane Austen, in 1789. In 1810 the property, which had been passed on to Austen's son, also called John, is known to have included 55.5 hectares (137 acres) of land, including formal gardens laid out to the south of the house. After being let following the death of the younger John Austen in 1820, Swifts Park was bought by hop merchant Robert Tooth in 1847. Tooth, whose sons, including brewer Robert and controversial priest Arthur, were born in Cranbrook, expanded the land area markedly, including purchasing the adjoining Wilsley Estate in 1857. Tooth lost money in the Overend, Gurney and Company bank crash of 1866, and died in 1871 after which his family were forced the sell the property which now covered around 158 hectares (390 acres).

Further changes in ownership saw the property, by now known as Swifts Place, owned by the family of Colonel Boyd Alexander at the turn of the 20th century. It was the birthplace of Lieutenant Boyd Alexander, author of From The Niger To The Nile, for which he received the Founder's Medal from the Royal Geographical Society in 1907 before being killed whilst exploring near Lake Chad in 1910. The house, with 18 bedrooms and "nearly 417 acres (169 ha)" of estate, was brought by Major Victor Cazalet, Conservative MP for Chippenham, in 1936. It was demolished and by 1937 a new one had been built in its place. The new house was designed in the Georgian style by Geddes Hyslop and renamed as Great Swifts. As a young child the actress Elizabeth Taylor, who was Cazalet's goddaughter, spent weekends and summer holidays on the estate in the years before World War II.

Following Cazalet's death in an air crash in 1943, the mansion was rented to Queen Marie of Yugoslavia and her sons. The family bought the estate, which by then covered 182 hectares (450 acres), in 1946. The Queen sold the house in 1950, living in a farmhouse on the estate. Later owners divided up much of the estate, and the house itself was bought with just 20 hectares (49 acres) of land in 1975. It was used as a nine-hole golf course for a time before being sold in 1994. The property was renamed as Oak Hill Manor and much of the land area bought back so that when it was offered for sale in 2008 it included 152 hectares (380 acres) of land.

== Cricket ground ==
Swifts Park
- Interactive map of Swifts Park

Ground information
- Location: Cranbrook, Kent
- Country: England
- Coordinates: 51.103°N 0.546°E (approx.)
- Establishment: 1862 (first recorded match)

Team information
Kent County Cricket Club	(1862–1863)
- As of 4 December 2017; Source: CricketArchive

Three cricket matches are known to have taken place within Swifts Park during the 1860s when the estate was owned by Robert Tooth. The first recorded match on the ground was in 1862, when Kent County Cricket Club played a Yorkshire team in the grounds first first-class cricket match, a benefit match played for Richard Mills of nearby Benenden. The following year the ground held another Kent first-class match, the opponents this time being Nottinghamshire. The best individual performance on the ground was by Nottinghamshire's John Jackson who scored the only century made on the ground and took 12 wickets in the 1863 match.

The final recorded match on the ground came in July 1863 when an amateur Gentlemen of Kent team played a South Wales Cricket Club team. The exact location of the ground within the estate is unknown and it is believed that the ground was prepared especially for these matches, initially as a result of difficulties arranging for Kent to play at Maidstone in 1862. Kent also played two first-class matches at School Field, Cranbrook in 1850–1851.
