= St Dunstan's Church, Cranbrook =

St Dunstan's Church
- Cathedral of the Weald
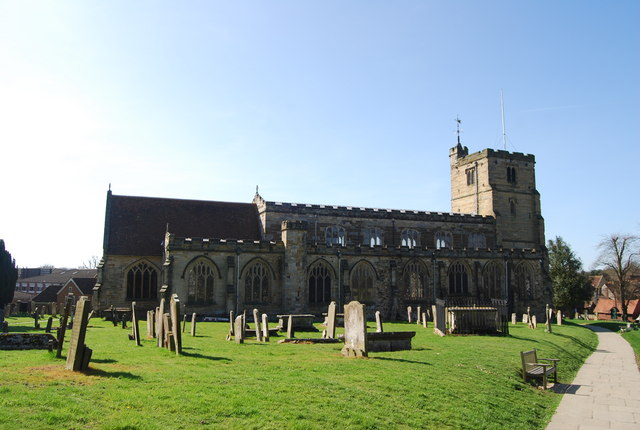
- The church in 2010, looking south
- St Dunstan's Church
- 51°05′50″N 0°32′10″E
- OS grid reference: TQ 77689 36169
- Location: Stone Street; Cranbrook, Kent
- Country: England
- Denomination: Church of England
- Previous denomination: Roman Catholic Church
- Website: Official website

Architecture
- Completed: late 13th century

Administration
- Province: Province of Canterbury
- Diocese: Diocese of Canterbury
- Archdeaconry: Archdeaconry of Maidstone
- Deanery: Weald Deanery
- Benefice: Cranbrook Benefice

St Dunstan's Church, also known as the Cathedral of the Weald, in Cranbrook, Kent, England, dates to the late 13th century. It is now Grade I listed.

Its 74 feet-high tower, completed in 1425, has a wooden figure of Father Time and his scythe on the south face. It also contains the prototype for the Big Ben clock in London. Work started in the late 13th century, the chancel arch and porch are a century later, the nave and tower were added after 1500, and William Slater and Ewan Christian restored the building in 1863. It is administered by the Weald Deanery, part of the Archdeaconry of Maidstone, which is in turn one of three archdeaconries in the Diocese of Canterbury.

Cranbrook native Comfort Starr, one of the founding members of Harvard College, was baptised at the church on 6 July 1589. A memorial plaque to Starr was installed in the church after his death in 1659.

== See also ==
- Listed buildings in Cranbrook and Sissinghurst
