= Dulwich Cranbrook =

Location
- Golford Road; Cranbrook, Kent, TN17 3NP; England
- Coordinates: 51.0973104°N 0.5685274°E

Information
- Type: Private school
- Religious affiliation: Church of England
- Established: 1938
- Head teacher: Sophie Bradshaw
- Gender: Coeducational
- Age: 2 to 16
- Houses: Gryphon, Lamassu, Pegasus, Phoenix.
- Colours: Navy blue, Grey
- Website: http://www.dulwichcranbrook.org

Dulwich Cranbrook is a co-educational independent school for children aged 2–16 at Coursehorn, near Cranbrook, Kent. Since September 2023, the Head has been Sophie Bradshaw.

== History ==
In the autumn of 1938, John Leakey, the Headmaster of what was then called Dulwich College Preparatory School in Dulwich, London, organised an emergency evacuation camp to be constructed in the orchard on his father-in-law’s land at Coursehorn, near Cranbrook, Kent. Originally there were 6 wooden huts, some bell tents, a marquee and some camp kitchen equipment.

After much preparation, on 1 September 1939, the train taking the 135 boys aged 5–13 set off from West Dulwich Station, arriving at Cranbrook Station after 9pm in the pouring rain and were transported by car, sheep lorry and on foot to the camp three miles away at Coursehorn.

The smallest boys (five and six year olds) were educated in the waiting house at Benenden School under Miss Dickson who remained at the school until she retired. Staff were able to find some accommodation nearby.

An extract from “The Kentish Express” at that time states: “The only School Evacuation Camp at present fully established and working in England is to be found in the rural district of the Weald at Coursehorn, Cranbrook, where two hundred boys of Dulwich College Preparatory School have an encampment on most modern and up-to-date lines on an eighteen acre estate. The encampment is composed of fifteen huts, or what can more suitably be described as temporary wooden buildings. A large Oast house has been converted into a recreation room where the boys can occupy their leisure in billiards, ping pong etc. while one hut has been set aside for draughts and other table games. Work is carried on at Cranbrook School, where the boys attend daily and where separate accommodation has been provided.”

Eventually, because of the increasing danger from enemy aircraft and parental anxiety, a move to the West Country was planned. Plans to move close to Lynton, Devon were thwarted so the Royal Oak Hotel at Betws-y-Coed was used instead. This was the school’s base until the end of the war.

Meanwhile, in 1944, the school at Coursehorn was used as a garrison for troops in preparation for the D-Day landings. The army vacated the school premises at the end of the war, and in September 1945 both schools in London and Coursehorn were re-opened.

== Notable alumni ==
- Dugald Bruce-Lockhart, actor and director
- Will Gompertz, Arts Editor of BBC News
- Ellie Kendrick, actress; Anne Frank, Game of Thrones
- Tana Ramsey, cookery author and TV broadcaster
- Tom Ransley, Olympic and World Gold Medallist Rower
- Sophie, Duchess of Edinburgh, wife of Prince Edward and member of the British Royal Family
