= School Field, Cranbrook =

Sports venue in the UK

School Field
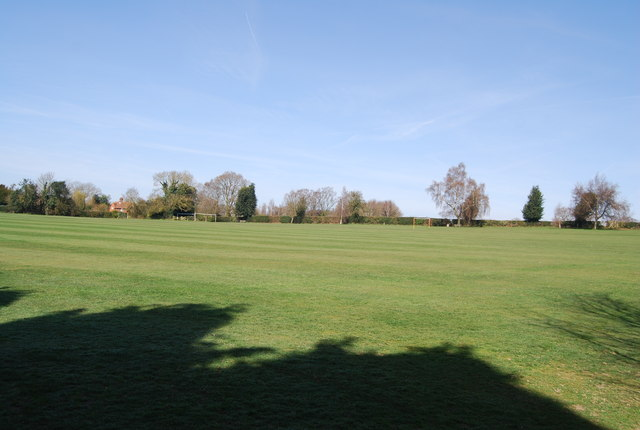
- Interactive map of School Field

Ground information
- Location: Cranbrook, Kent
- Country: England
- Coordinates: 51.101°N 0.537°E
- Operator: Cranbrook School

Team information
Kent County Cricket Club	(1850–1851)
Cranbrook School	(1945–)
- As of 5 December 2017; Source: CricketArchive

School Field Ground is a sports ground owned by Cranbrook School located in the town of Cranbrook, Kent, England. It is known by the school as Big Side Playing Field. The field, which is 4.63 hectares (11.4 acres) in size, and located south of Quaker Lane, is used by the school for cricket, rugby union and hockey.

== Cricket history ==
The ground has been used as a cricket field since at least the mid 19th century, at which point it was in private hands. Kent County Cricket Club played two first-class cricket matches on a ground specifically prepared on the site, one in 1850 and the other in 1851, both against England XIs. Kent also played two first-class matches at nearby Swifts Park in 1862–63.

The ground has been used by the school since the 1940s, including for matches against teams such as MCC. A South African Universities team and a South Africa Schools XI played on the ground in 1967 whilst apartheid was in operation. In July 1968, Free Foresters played a United States team on the ground.
