= Coursehorn =

Hamlet in Kent, England

Coordinates: 51.093030°N 0.557920°E

- Location within Kent
- Civil parish: Cranbrook
- District: Tunbridge Wells
- Shire county: Kent
- Region: South East
- Country: England
- Sovereign state: United Kingdom
- Post town: Cranbrook
- Postcode district: TN17
- Police: Kent
- Fire: Kent
- Ambulance: South East Coast
- UK Parliament: Weald of Kent

Coursehorn is a hamlet located immediately to the east of the town of Cranbrook in Kent, England. It is the site of the local cemetery and Dulwich Cranbrook, an independent school.

The Old Cloth Hall, showing Cranbrook's medieval importance to the wool industry, is also located in Coursehorn. It is listed Grade II* on the National Heritage List for England.
