= Cranbrook, Kent =

Town in Kent, England

Coordinates: 51°05′48″N 00°32′08″E

Cranbrook
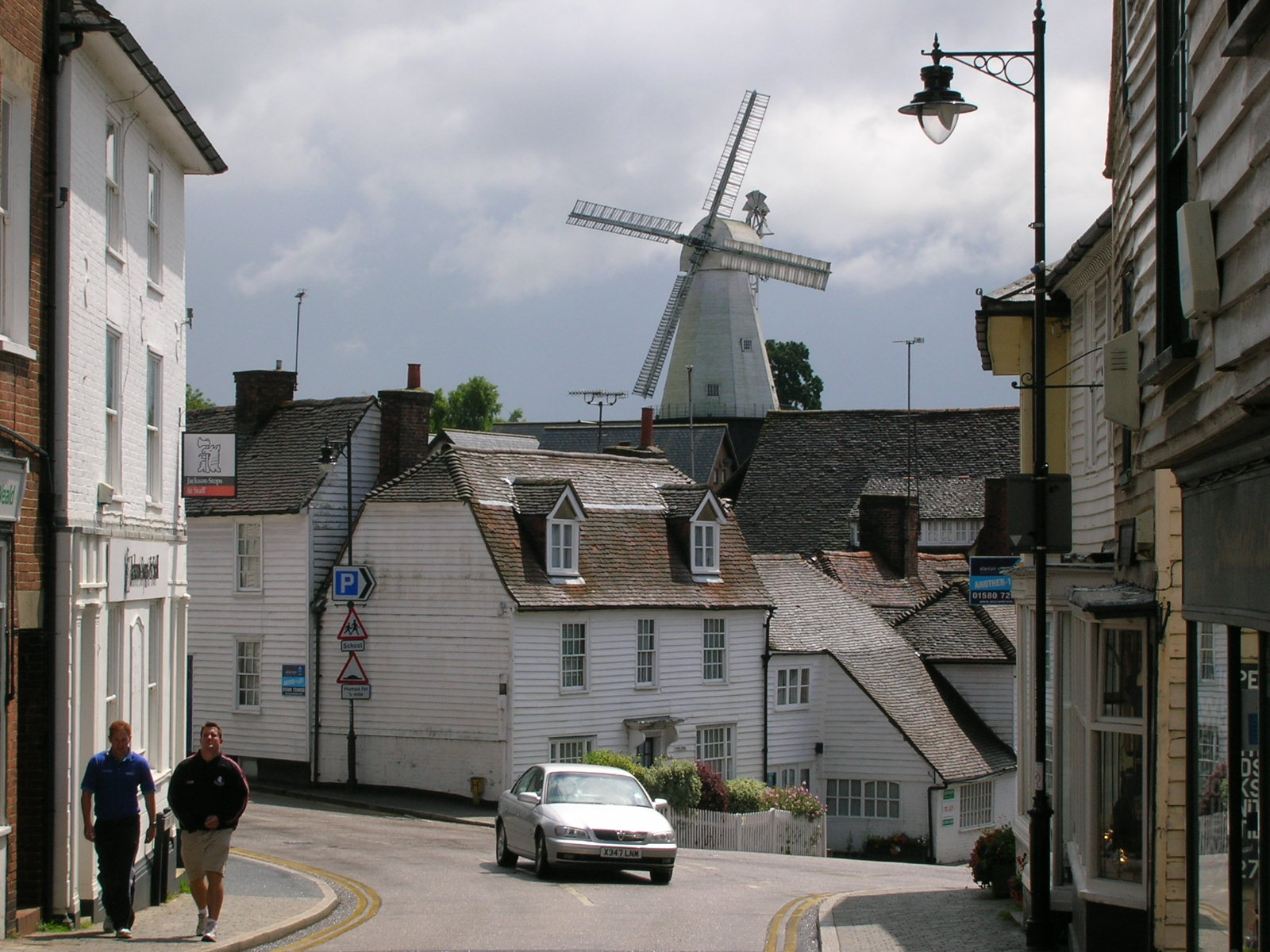
- Stone Street, looking southeast towards Union Windmill

- Location within Kent
- Population: 6,717 (2011 census)
- OS grid reference: TQ775365
- Civil parish: Cranbrook and Sissinghurst
- District: Tunbridge Wells
- Shire county: Kent
- Region: South East
- Country: England
- Sovereign state: United Kingdom
- Post town: CRANBROOK
- Postcode district: TN17
- Dialling code: 01580
- Police: Kent
- Fire: Kent
- Ambulance: South East Coast
- UK Parliament: Weald of Kent

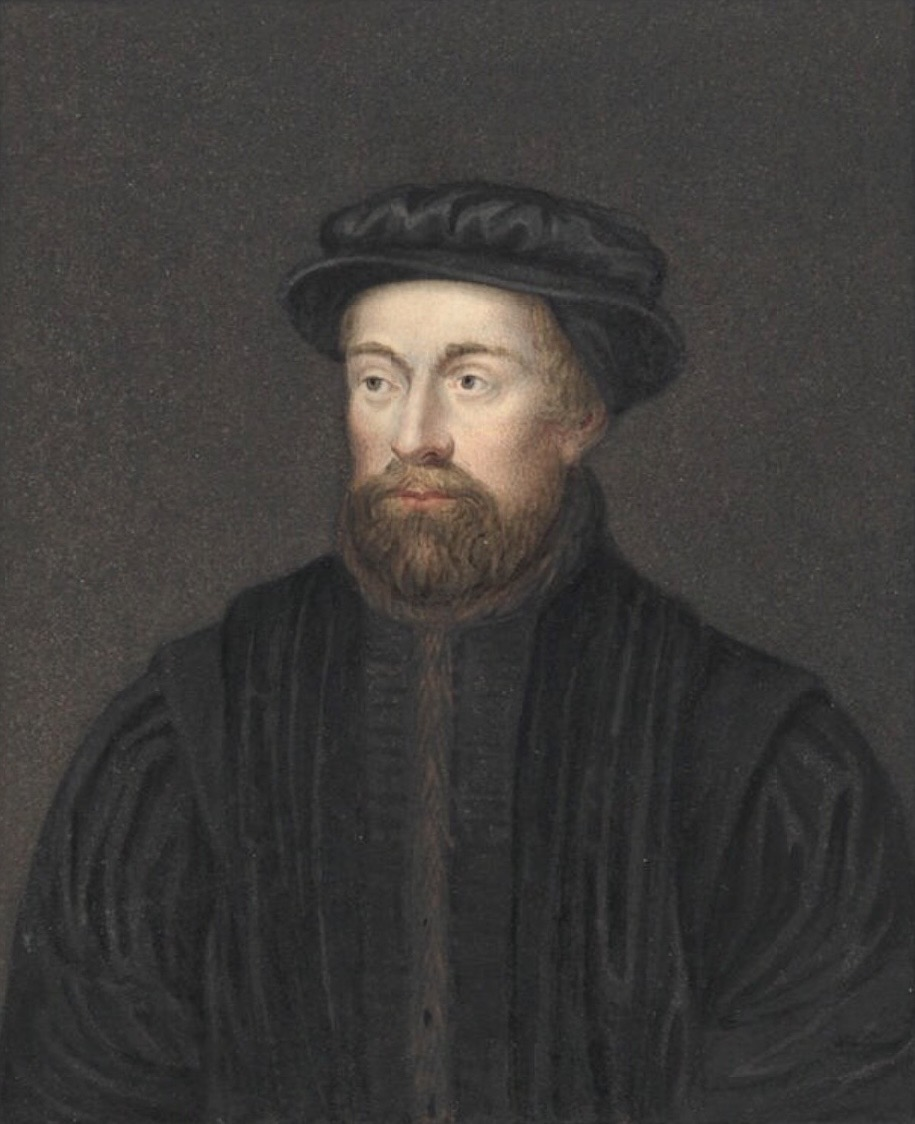
John Baker

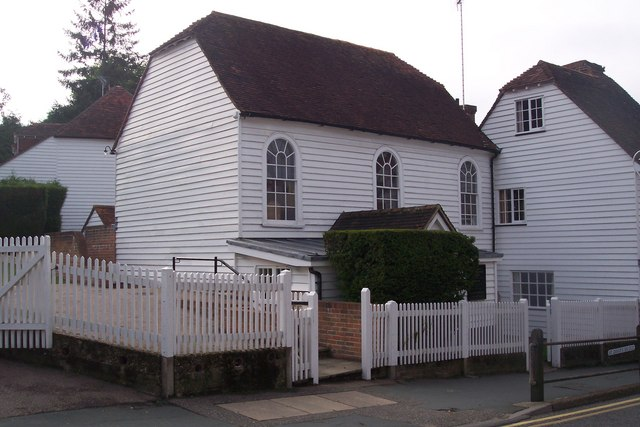
Cranbrook Strict Baptist Chapel

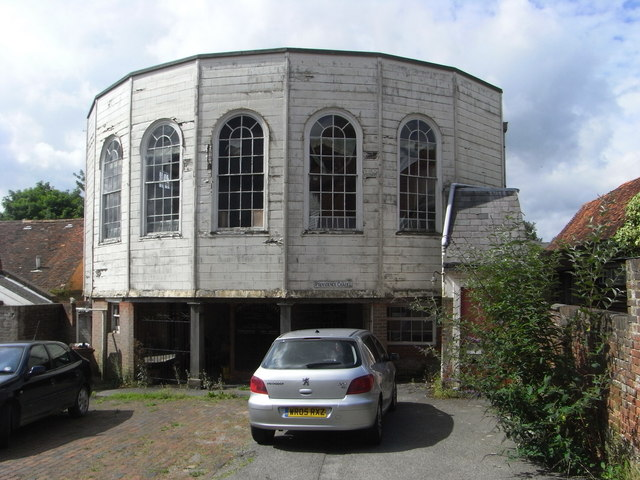
The former Providence Baptist Chapel

Cranbrook is a town in the civil parish of Cranbrook and Sissinghurst, in the Weald of Kent in South East England. It lies roughly half-way between Maidstone and Hastings, about 38 miles (61 km) southeast of central London.

The smaller settlements of Sissinghurst, Swattenden, Colliers Green and Hartley lie within the civil parish. The population of the parish was 6,717 in 2011.

== History ==
The place name Cranbrook derives from Old English cran bric, meaning Crane Marsh, marshy ground frequented by cranes (although more probably herons). Spelling of the place name has evolved over the centuries from Cranebroca (c. 1100); by 1226 it was recorded as Cranebroc, then Cranebrok. By 1610 the name had become Cranbrooke, which evolved into the current spelling.

There is evidence of early activity here in the Roman period at the former Little Farningham Farm where a substantial iron working site was investigated in the 1950s. In 2000 the site was the subject of a Kent Archaeological Society fieldwork project to establish the extent of the site and the line of the Roman road from Rochester to Bodiam, which was published in 2001. The site had earlier produced a number of clay tiles bearing the mark of the Roman Fleet, or Classis Brittanica who may have been overseeing the work.

Edward III brought over Flemish weavers to develop the Wealden cloth industry using wool from Romney Marsh; Cranbrook became the centre of this as it had local supplies of fuller's earth and plenty of streams that could be dammed to drive the fulling mills. Iron-making was carried on at Bedgebury on the River Teise, an industry which dates back to Roman times. The tributaries of the River Beult around Cranbrook powered 17 watermills at one time. In 1290 the town received a charter from Archbishop Peckham, allowing it to hold a market in the High Street.

Baker's Cross on the eastern edge of the town is linked to John Baker, Chancellor of the Exchequer, under Queen Mary, a Catholic. Legend holds that he was riding on his way to Cranbrook in order to have two local Protestants executed, when he turned back after the news reached him that Queen Mary was dead. Different versions of the legend have it that he heard the parish church bells ringing, or that he was met by a messenger. The place where this happened was, in the words of biographer and historian Arthur Irwin Dasent, "at a place where three roads meet, known to this day as Baker's Cross".

Popular legend also has it that Baker was killed at Baker's Cross; although in fact he died in his house in London.

The town developed around the "King's High Road" (now named as High Street, Stone Street and Waterloo Road) until the Second World War. Following the war, additional housing was built adjacent to the historic centre – the Wheatfield Estate to the north and the Frythe Estate to the south. In the 1970s, a Conservation Area was designated in the town centre. Most of the buildings on High Street, Stone Street and The Hill are listed.

== Governance ==
In 1974 Cranbrook Rural District was merged into the Borough of Tunbridge Wells. In 2010 Francis Rook of the Liberal Democrats won one of the three council seats in the Benenden and Cranbrook ward from the Conservatives to become one of only 6 non-Conservative councillors out of 48 in the borough.

The name of the parish council was changed from Cranbrook Parish Council to Cranbrook and Sissinghurst Parish Council in 2009. The parish council is based in the Old Fire Station on Stone Street.

== Geography ==
Located on the Maidstone to Hastings road, it is five miles north of Hawkhurst. Baker's Cross is on the eastern outskirts of the town.

Cranbrook is on the Hastings Beds, alternating sands and clays which are more resistant to erosion than the surrounding clays and so form the hills of the High Weald. The geology of the area has played a major role in the town's development, deposits of iron ore and fuller's earth were important in the iron industry and cloth industry respectively.

== Demography ==
At the 2011 census, Cranbrook had 6,717 residents. The Kent Structure Plan calls it the smallest town in Kent, although Fordwich has a town council and just 381 residents.

== Economy ==
Since the decline of the cloth trade, agriculture became the mainstay of the economy.

The first bank was opened in Cranbrook in 1803 by Samuel Waddington. It closed in 1805. In 1804, the Cranbrook Bank was opened. It changed its name to the Weald of Kent Bank in 1812 and then to Bishop & Co's Bank in 1813 before being declared bankrupt in October 1814.

The Tooth family of Great Swifts, near Cranbrook, established a brewery at Baker's Cross. A large part of their trade was the export of beer to Australia. Subsequently, John Tooth emigrated to Australia in the early 1830s, traded for a time as a general merchant, and then in 1835, with his brother-in-law, John Newnham, opened a brewery in Sydney. He named the brewery Kent Brewery, which continued to 1985. Meanwhile, the brewery at Cranbrook had been sold to one William Barling Sharpe, whose daughter had married the local estate agent, William Winch. The brewery Sharpe & Winch was established in Baker's Cross at some point prior to 1846 by William Barling Sharpe (who is buried with his wife, Ann, in the cemetery at Westwell, and his daughter, Elizabeth Louisa, who married William Francis Winch). The brewery assumed the name Sharpe & Winch in 1892, and was purchased and taken over by Frederick Leney & Sons Ltd, a Wateringbury company, in 1927. The brewery were responsible for the mock-Tudor extension to the 18th century Baker's Cross House (a Grade II listed building).

== Culture and community ==
During the 19th century, a group of artists known as the "Cranbrook Colony" were located here. The Colony artists tended to paint scenes of domestic life in rural Kent – cooking and washing, children playing, and other family activities.

Queen's Hall Theatre, part of Cranbrook School, sponsors many theatre groups, including the Cambridge Footlights and Cranbrook Operatic and Dramatic Society (CODS). Cranbrook Town Band, founded in the 1920s, is a British-style brass band, which performs regular concerts in the Queen's Hall, St Dunstan's Church and around Kent.

There have been many plans to create a community hub, starting with a proposal to convert the old council offices. The focus then switched to a £2m building planned on Wilkes Field, next to the Co-op carpark. As of 2013 plans included small community rooms and three large day rooms which could convert into a hall for 300 people, along with a day care centre, council offices, public toilets and even the police station. In April 2016 residents voted against the parish council taking out the £2m loan required for the project, but in September 2016 the Borough Council approved a £20m regeneration plan that would create shops, flats and a community centre.

== Cultural references ==
Cranbrook is the name of a hymn tune written by Canterbury cobbler Thomas Clark around 1805, and later used as a tune for the Christmas hymn "While Shepherds Watched Their Flocks". The tune later became associated with the Yorkshire song "On Ilkla Moor Baht 'at".

"Cranbrook is a village giving the impression of trying to remember what once made it important."

— H.E. Bates, who knew Cranbrook well, -The Darling Buds of May

== Landmarks ==
There are many medieval buildings in the area. At Wilsley Green, to the north of the town, is a Grade I-listed Wealden hall house and cloth hall that dates to the late 14th century. There are a number of medieval cloth halls around the town – the George Hotel is in one dating to 1400, there are two more further down the High St on the north side dating from the late 15th century and 16th century. There are 15th century examples at Goddards Green Farm on Angley Rd, Hill House on The Hill, and on Friezley Lane.

Glassenbury Park is a late-15th-century manor house on the road to Goudhurst with a 1730s front block, remodelled in 1877–79 by Anthony Salvia. Wilsley Hotel was originally built in 1864–70 as a home for the Colony artist John Callcott Horsley, designer of the first Christmas card twenty years earlier. The architect was Richard Norman Shaw in his first important domestic commission. The war memorial was erected on Angley Road in 1920.

=== Windmills ===
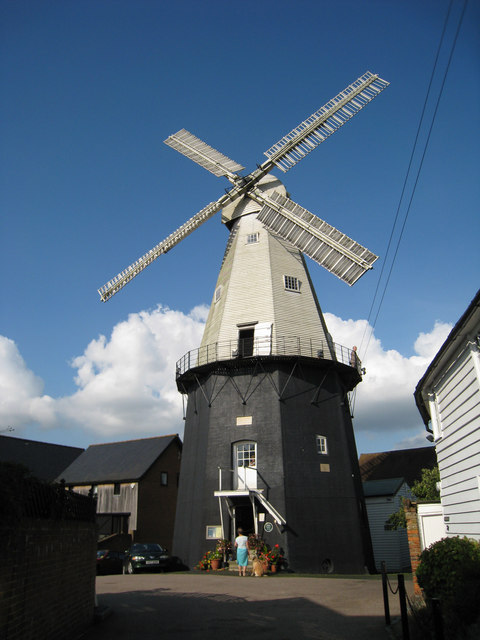
Union Mill

Over the years there have been four windmills in and around Cranbrook of which only the Union Mill survives and dominates the local skyline. It was built in 1814 for Henry Dobell, who went bankrupt five years later. Then the mill was run by a union of creditors until 1832. The Russell family ran it for the next 128 years, when it was sold to Kent County Council, who have restored it. The mill is kept in working order to this day. It stands ¼ mile (400 m) southeast of the church.

Cranbrook Common smock mill had common sails and was winded by hand. It was marked on the Ordnance Survey map covering the area which was published between 1858 and 1872. The mill was last worked in 1876 and was demolished on 9 August 1902. The mill stood 1¾ miles (2.8 km) north north east of the church.

Windmill Hill is thought to have been home to a smock mill that was moved to Sissinghurst c. 1814. It stood ¼ mile (400 m) west north west of the church. This mill was marked on Emanuel Bowen's map of Kent (1736) and also on Andrews, Drury and Herbert's map of Kent, 1769. The latter also shows a mill at Saint's Hill, 1 mile 5 furlongs (2.6 km) north east of the church.

== Transport ==
The junction of the A262 (Lamberhurst – Biddenden) and the A229 (Rochester – Hawkhurst) pass near Cranbrook. Cranbrook is served by Arriva Southern Counties buses.

The Hawkhurst Branch Line ran a short distance from the town, but Cranbrook railway station, which was 2 miles (3.2 km) southwest of the centre, stopped operations on 12 June 1961. The nearest operating station is at Staplehurst.

== Education ==
Rainbow Pre-school provides early years education in the centre of town. Cranbrook Church of England Primary School has been on its current site in Carriers Road since 1985; it was placed in special measures from November 2013 until June 2015. Colliers Green Primary School also lies within the parish, to the north-west of Cranbrook. Dulwich Preparatory School (3–13) at Coursehorn to the east of town, is a legacy of the World War II evacuation of Dulwich College Preparatory School from London. Alumni include Sophie, Duchess of Edinburgh and its buildings include two cloth halls, one dating from the 15th century and one from the 16th century.

Cranbrook School (13–18) is a voluntary-aided grammar school, dating back to 1518. A third of the pupils are boarders. The schoolhouse built in 1727 is now the Headmaster's House. The school's observatory is named after alumnus and NASA astronaut Piers Sellers; it houses the 22.5 inch Alan Young telescope operated by the Cranbrook and District Science and Astronomy Society (CADSAS).

High Weald Academy (11–18), formerly known as Angley School, was a comprehensive school. It was formed by the merger of Mary Sheafe Girls' School and Swattenden Boys' School in the 1970s and became Kent's first specialist sports college in 2000. In September 2012 it was taken over by the Hayesbrook Academy Trust (now the Brook Learning Trust) who run the Hayesbrook School in Tonbridge. The school closed in 2022.

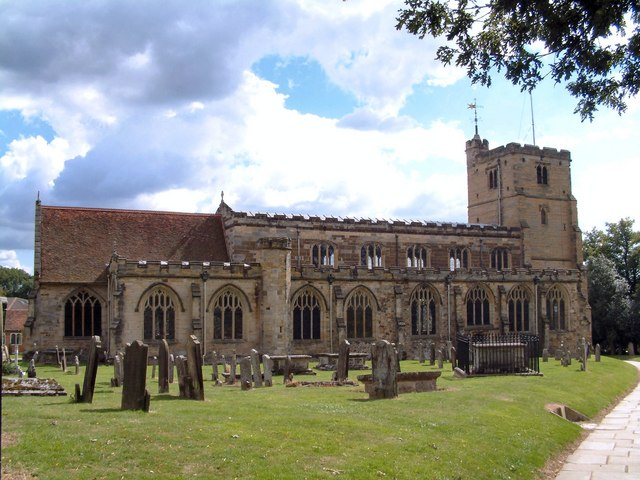
St Dunstan's parish church, the "Cathedral of the Weald"

== Religious sites ==
St Dunstan's Church is known as the "Cathedral of the Weald"; its 74 feet-high tower, completed in 1425, has a wooden figure of Father Time and his scythe on the south face. It also contains the prototype for the Big Ben clock in London.

Cranbrook Strict Baptist Chapel was built in 1787 and is the only survivor of two Strict Baptist chapels within a short distance in the village centre; Providence Chapel is now closed. Cranbrook Congregational Church was built in Neo-Gothic style in 1857, replacing an earlier chapel. It remains Congregational, having stayed outside the United Reformed Church denomination. The Catholic St Theodore's Church opened in 1958.

== Sport ==
In 1652, a court case brought at Cranbrook by church authorities against John Rabson and others refers to "a certain unlawful game called cricket", one of the sport's earliest references. The court, however, ruled that the game was not unlawful. Kent County Cricket Club played two matches on School Field in the 1850s and two on Swifts Park, an estate just north-east of the town, in the 1860s.

Cranbrook Juniors Football Club (CJFC) play in the Crowborough & District Junior Football League. Home matches are played on the Rammell Field, Cranbrook on Saturday mornings.

Cranbrook Rugby Club (CRFC) play their home matches on the various rugby pitches situated around the town, including the Jaeger and Scott fields. The clubhouse is based at the Cranbrook Rugby Club, on Angley Road. Age groups range from under-7s to the senior adult teams.

The Weald Sports Centre has indoor and outdoor facilities, including tennis courts, an indoor sports hall, a swimming pool and a dance studio.

There was an open-air swimming pool on the Frythe Estate which closed when the Weald Sports Centre opened in 2000.

== Notable people ==
- Rev William Robert Fountains Addison (1883–1962), recipient of the Victoria Cross in the First World War
- Robert Triall, Presbyterian minister and prisoner on the Bass Rock
- Boyd Alexander, (1873–1910), British Army officer, explorer and ornithologist
- Giles Cooper, (1968–), entertainment producer & promoter. Best known as chairman of the annual Royal Variety Performance
- Rosamund Brunel Gotch, (1864–1949), English costume designer, illustrator and writer
- Frederick Daniel Hardy, (1827–1911), genre painter and member of the Cranbrook Colony
- Harry Hill, (1964–), comedian, born Matthew Hall, educated in Cranbrook
- William Huntington S.S., (1745–1813), preacher and eccentric
- Chris Langham, (1949–), actor and writer
- Kevin Lygo, (1957–), Head of ITV
- Piers Sellers, (1955–2016), first British-born astronaut
- Tim Smit, (1954–), founder of the Eden Project
- Robert Tooth, (1821–1893), prominent Sydney businessman and brewer
- Arthur Tooth, (1839–1931), Church of England priest imprisoned under the Public Worship Regulation Act 1874
- Thomas Webster, (1800–1886), genre painter
- Peter West, (1920–2003), TV presenter and sports commentator, born, brought up and educated in Cranbrook
- Comfort Starr, (1589–1659), 17th-century English physician, was one of the five founders of Harvard College
- Hamilton; 'Bessie' Elizabeth Sterling Hamilton, Matron of Cranbrook Cottage Hospital, 1897–1912. Hamilton trained at The London Hospital under Eva Luckes between 1896 and 1897.

== Climate ==
The Köppen Climate Classification subtype for this climate is "Cfb" (Marine West Coast Climate).

Climate data for Cranbrook
Month	Jan	Feb	Mar	Apr	May	Jun	Jul	Aug	Sep	Oct	Nov	Dec	Year
Mean daily maximum °C (°F)	7 (44)	7 (45)	10 (50)	13 (56)	17 (62)	21 (69)	22 (71)	22 (71)	19 (66)	14 (58)	10 (50)	7 (45)	14 (57)
Mean daily minimum °C (°F)	1 (33)	1 (33)	2 (35)	4 (39)	6 (43)	9 (49)	12 (53)	11 (52)	9 (49)	6 (42)	3 (38)	2 (35)	6 (42)
Average precipitation mm (inches)	64 (2.5)	48 (1.9)	41 (1.6)	53 (2.1)	48 (1.9)	41 (1.6)	61 (2.4)	58 (2.3)	53 (2.1)	71 (2.8)	79 (3.1)	66 (2.6)	680 (26.9)
Source: Weatherbase

== See also ==
- Cranbrook, British Columbia, named by Colonel James Baker for his hometown in Kent.
