= Wolverhampton Art Gallery =

Art gallery in the West Midlands, England

Coordinates: 52.5868°N 2.1269°W

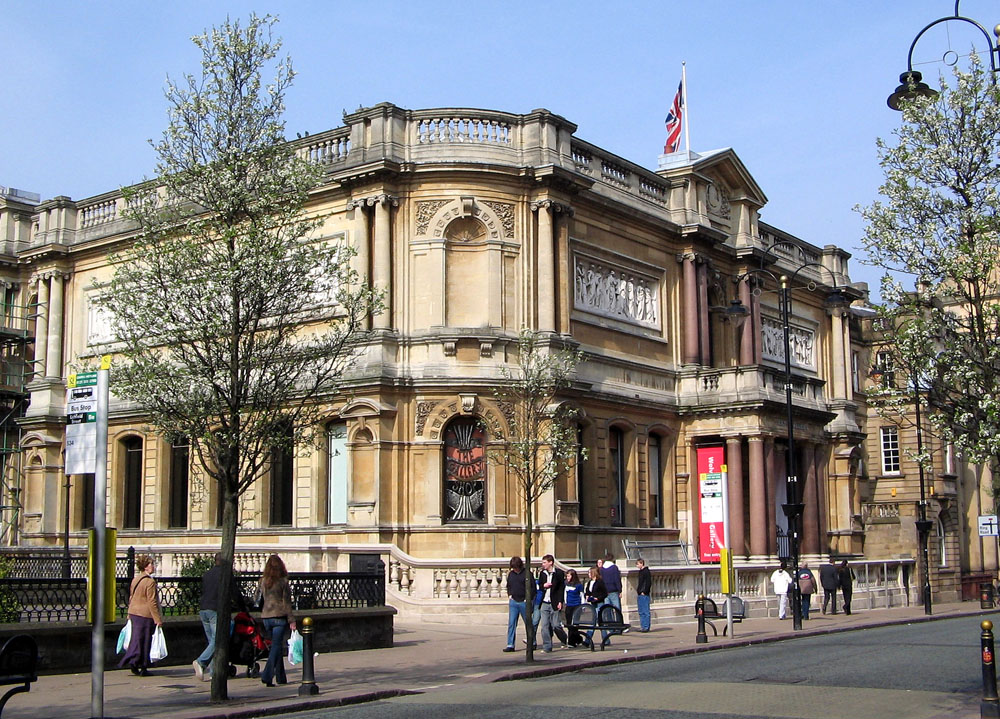
- Established: 1884
- Location: Lichfield Street, Wolverhampton, England
- Collection size: 20,000 objects
- Visitors: 158,658 (2008)
- Website: www.wolverhamptonart.org.uk

Wolverhampton Art Gallery is located in Wolverhampton, England. The building was funded and constructed by local contractor Philip Horsman (1825–1890), and built on land provided by the municipal authority. It opened in May 1884.

== The building ==
The two-storey building of Wolverhampton Art Gallery was designed by prominent Birmingham architect Julius Chatwin (1829–1907). It was built of Bath stone, an Oolitic Limestone from Bath, Somerset, with six red granite columns indicating the main entrance. The decorative sculptural frieze on the facade is composed of sixteen characters representing the Arts and Crafts, including sculpture, painting, architecture, pottery, glassblowing, and wrought-iron work. It is a Grade II* listed building.

In 2006–07 the building was refurbished by Purcell, partly modernized and extended to create additional exhibition spaces.

== The collection ==
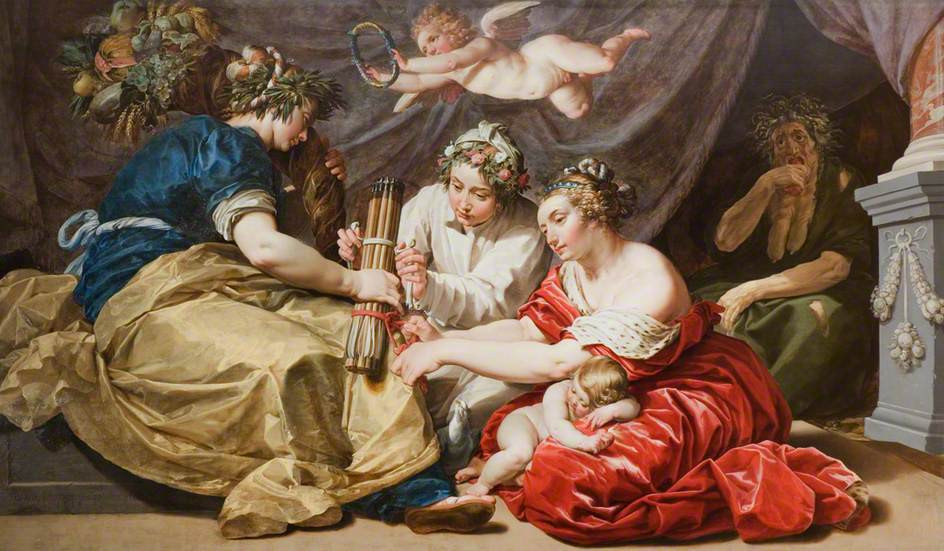
Abraham Janssens, Peace and Plenty Binding the Arrows of War, 1614

The most outstanding artwork of international importance in the collection is the large-scale painting Peace and Plenty Binding the Arrows of War (1614) by the Flemish Baroque painter Abraham Janssens van Nuyssen (ca. 1567/1576–1632). Commissioned and paid for by the Antwerp Guild of Old Crossbowmen, it was a pendant to the Rubens’s Crowning of the Victor. In the 1800s, the city's guilds were broken up and their treasures dispersed. Janssen's picture eventually found its way to a Mrs Thornley of Birmingham. In 1885, she sold it to Wolverhampton Art Gallery. This is the only painting by Janssens in any British public collection and a splendid example of Flemish Baroque art.

Apart from the Janssens painting, the collection of Old Masters is relatively small. It includes a version of A Spinner's Grace by Gerard Dou and Bouquet of Flowers by Jan van Huysum. There is a collection of Old Master drawings, which includes graphic work by Wenceslas Hollar and Alessandro Allori.

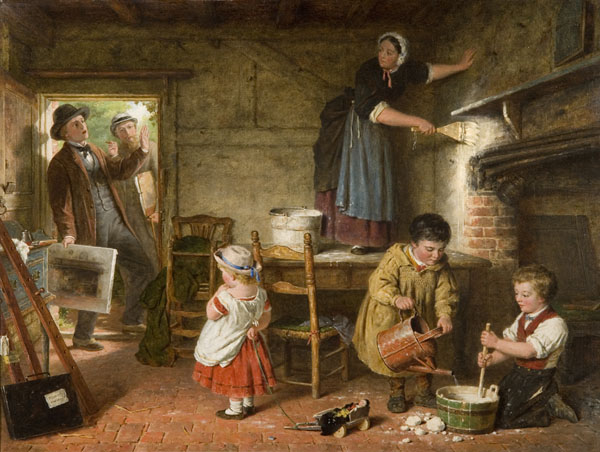
The Dismayed Artist by Frederick Daniel Hardy, 1866

A significant part of the gallery's collection was formed from bequests and gifts given by local benefactors and patrons of art. These include those from the tin-toy manufacturer Sidney Cartwright (1802–1883), Philip Horsman and hardware manufacturer Paul Lutz (1832–1899). They mainly collected contemporary and early 19th-century British art and today the holdings of the gallery are still particularly strong in artworks from the Victorian period.

In the 1920s-1950s, a large number of artworks by Frank Brangwyn (1867–1956) were given to the gallery by the artist himself, and by his friend and member of Wolverhampton Art Gallery and Public Library Committee Matthew Biggar Walker (1873–1950).

In 1924, a significant collection of Eastern weapons was secured. During the first decades of the 20th century many specimens of Eastern applied art and British and Eastern ceramics and glass were given to the gallery by the members of the prominent local Bantock family and several other collectors.

The museum has a collection of 114 historic tsuba from Japan. Items in the collection range from the Momoyama period (16th century) to the end of the Edo period (19th century). The tsuba were part of a wider collection of weapons and sword guards donated by councilor Davis Green in October 1924. Originally the collection belonged to a Mr. C.E.F. Griffiths and was loaned to the gallery. The collection was reclaimed by the family, it is presumed that Mr. Griffiths died, and put it up for auction at Dudley Auction Rooms. Councilor Green bought the whole collection for £350 and donated it to the gallery.

The gallery has substantial collection of japanned ware and Bilston enamels. These collections represent trades and manufactures for which Wolverhampton was famous in the 18th and 19th centuries. The purposeful collecting policy of the 1970s brought to the gallery a number of high-quality artworks by leading British artists of the 18th-century Georgian period.

The gallery has strong holdings of artworks by local artists, such as John Fullwood (1854–1931), Joseph Vickers de Ville (1856–1925), George Phoenix (1863–1935), Alfred Egerton Cooper (1883–1974). In 1990s, following the re-structure of museum services across the area, the art and local history collections of the Bilston Museum and Art Gallery (now Bilston Craft Gallery) were transferred to Wolverhampton. They brought to the gallery artworks by Edwin Butler Bayliss (1874–1950), another local painter of the industrial landscape of the Black Country.

Since the late 1960s, Wolverhampton Art Gallery has been amassing a substantial collection of pop art. In 2013 it mounted a retrospective of Pauline Boty, who had died aged 28 in 1966, which helped to re-establish her reputation.

A special feature of the gallery is the collection of artworks which document and analyse the time of Troubles in Northern Ireland.

By 2009 the gallery's collection consisted of about 12,000 artefacts: oil paintings and works on paper from the 17th to the 20th centuries; collection of Eastern objects of applied art; japanned ware; enamels; ceramics and glass; dolls and toys; and local history. Dr John Fraser's collection of geological specimens has also been preserved at the gallery.

== Permanent displays ==
A selection of objects from the collection are on permanent show in several display rooms.

=== The Georgian room ===
Paintings by the 18th-century artists from the gallery's collection include Portrait of the Lee Family by Joseph Highmore, The Provoked Wife by Johann Zoffany, Portrait of Erasmus Darwin (1792) by Joseph Wright of Derby, Apotheosis of Penelope Boothby by Henry Fuseli, and The Arrival of King Louis XVIII of France at Calais by Wolverhampton-born Edward Bird. Portrait miniatures, Bilston enamels depicting famous actors of the era, and some examples of the 18th-century Eastern and British ceramics are on display.

=== The Victorian rooms ===
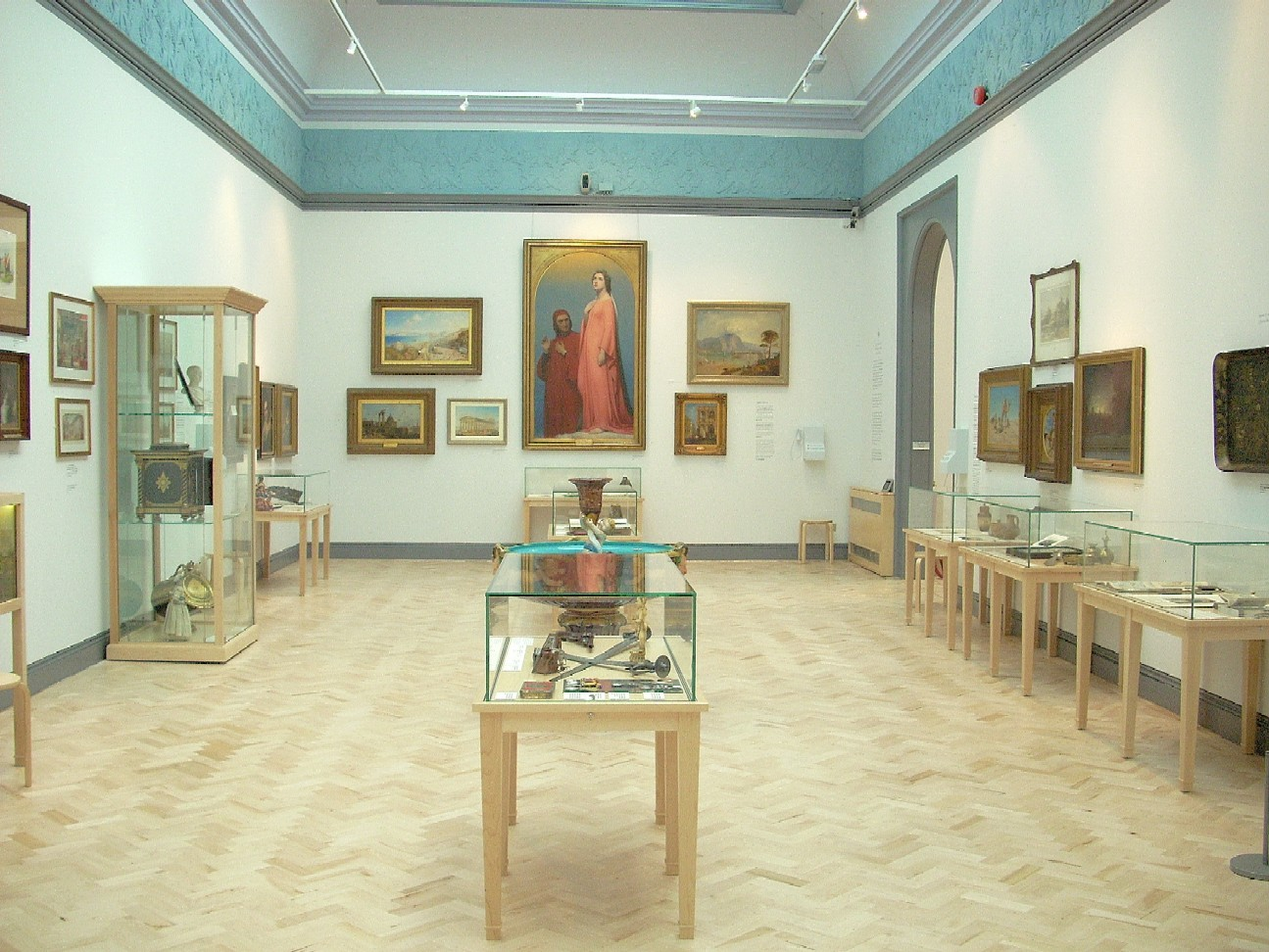
The Victorian Room

The display in the two Victorian rooms present British 19th-century art in its relation with wider world. It includes landscapes by Henry Mark Anthony, David Cox, James Baker Pyne, David Roberts, narrative paintings by the Cranbrook Colony artists, religious paintings by Pre-Raphaelite artist Frederic Shields, japanned ware by local manufacturers which were shown at The Great Exhibition, examples of local Myatt pottery, and Eastern objects - Chinese ceramics and mirror paintings, Japanese woodblock prints, Indian pottery and weapons, Persian metalware - collected by local people.

=== Pop art ===
The pop art gallery is a retro-themed, interactive space which allows visitors to explore the world of pop art with its vibrant mix of popular culture, social commentary, nostalgia, kitsch and celebrity. The contents of the gallery change approximately every six months to reflect a different theme found within the pop art movement. The display has contained works by influential pop artists Andy Warhol, Peter Blake, Roy Lichtenstein, David Hockney, Clive Barker, Eduardo Paolozzi and Derek Boshier.

=== The Northern Ireland collection ===
The permanent display of the Northern Ireland Collection considers the role of visual artists in depicting and presenting the country's contested past and future. Artists represented in the Northern Ireland collection include Willie Doherty, Jock McFadyen, Rita Duffy, John Keane, Siobhan Hapaska and Robert Priseman. Highlights from Wolverhampton Art Gallery collection are shown alongside borrowed exhibits that offer different perspectives on the history of the conflict and its resolution.

== The Makers Dozen Studios ==
The Makers Dozen Studios is a complex of workshop spaces for artists and makers in the West Midlands. It reflects the fact that for several decades following the founding of the gallery, Wolverhampton's School of Art and Art Gallery were under the same roof. The studios are based on Wulfruna Street and are adjoined by the new extension at the gallery uniting the studios with the original Victorian building.

== Education and access ==
The Georgian Gallery contains a number of specially-commissioned pieces of furniture in the Georgian style which provide a hands-on exploration of key themes of the period, from scientific discoveries to the events of the theatrical world, and offer a flavour of life in the 18th century.

The display Sensing Sculpture encourages visitors to touch, smell and listen as well as look at the works on display. Many of the sculptures come from Wolverhampton Art Gallery collection; some are on loan from their makers while others have been specially commissioned for the gallery. Braille interpretation is provided throughout the gallery, and visitors are encouraged to learn some Braille during their visit.

== Other venues ==
At present, Wolverhampton Art Gallery forms a main part of Wolverhampton Arts and Museums Services, along with Bantock House and Bilston Craft Gallery.

== Gallery ==
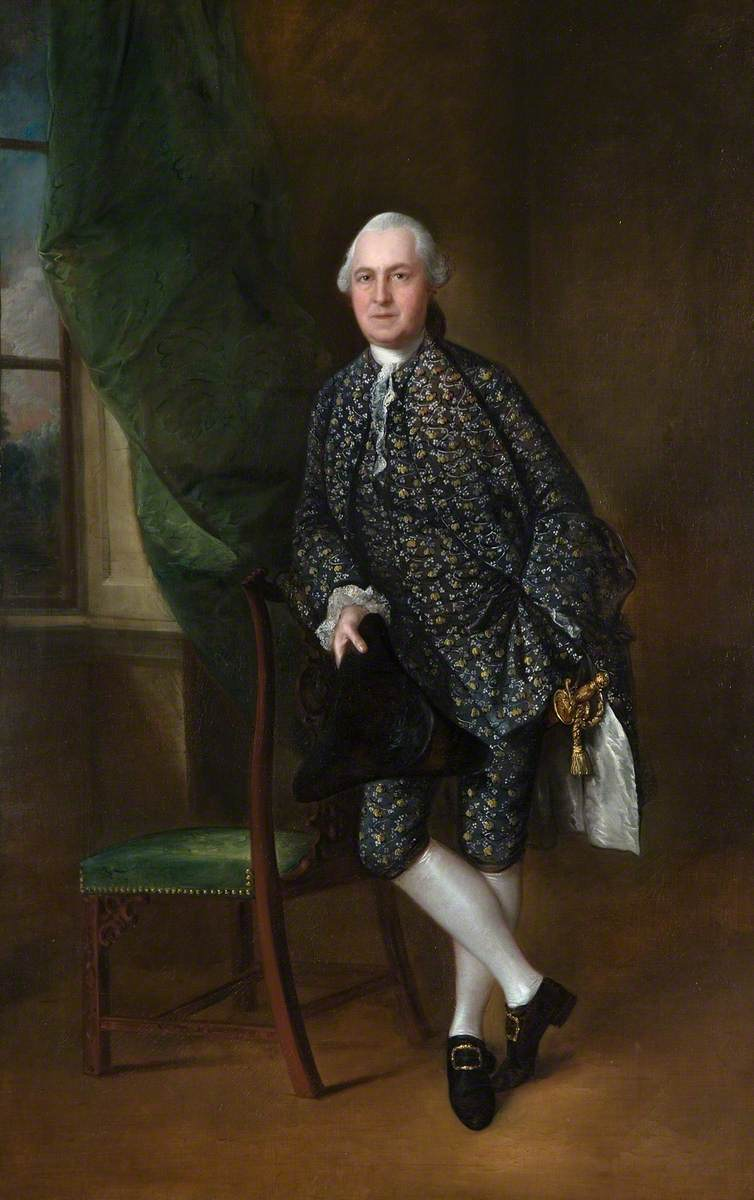
Portrait of Sir Edward Turner by Thomas Gainsborough (1762)

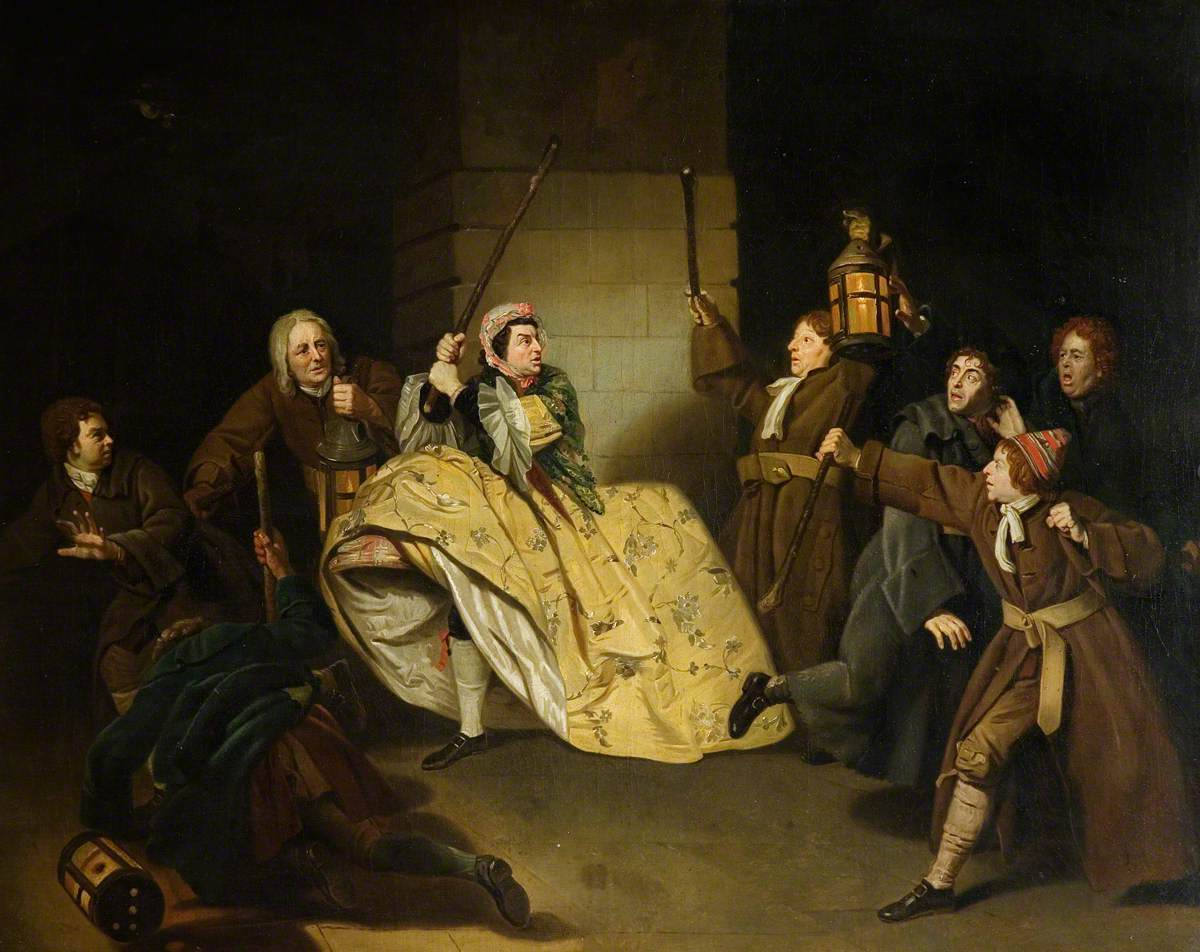
David Garrick in The Provoked Wife by Johann Zoffany, 1765

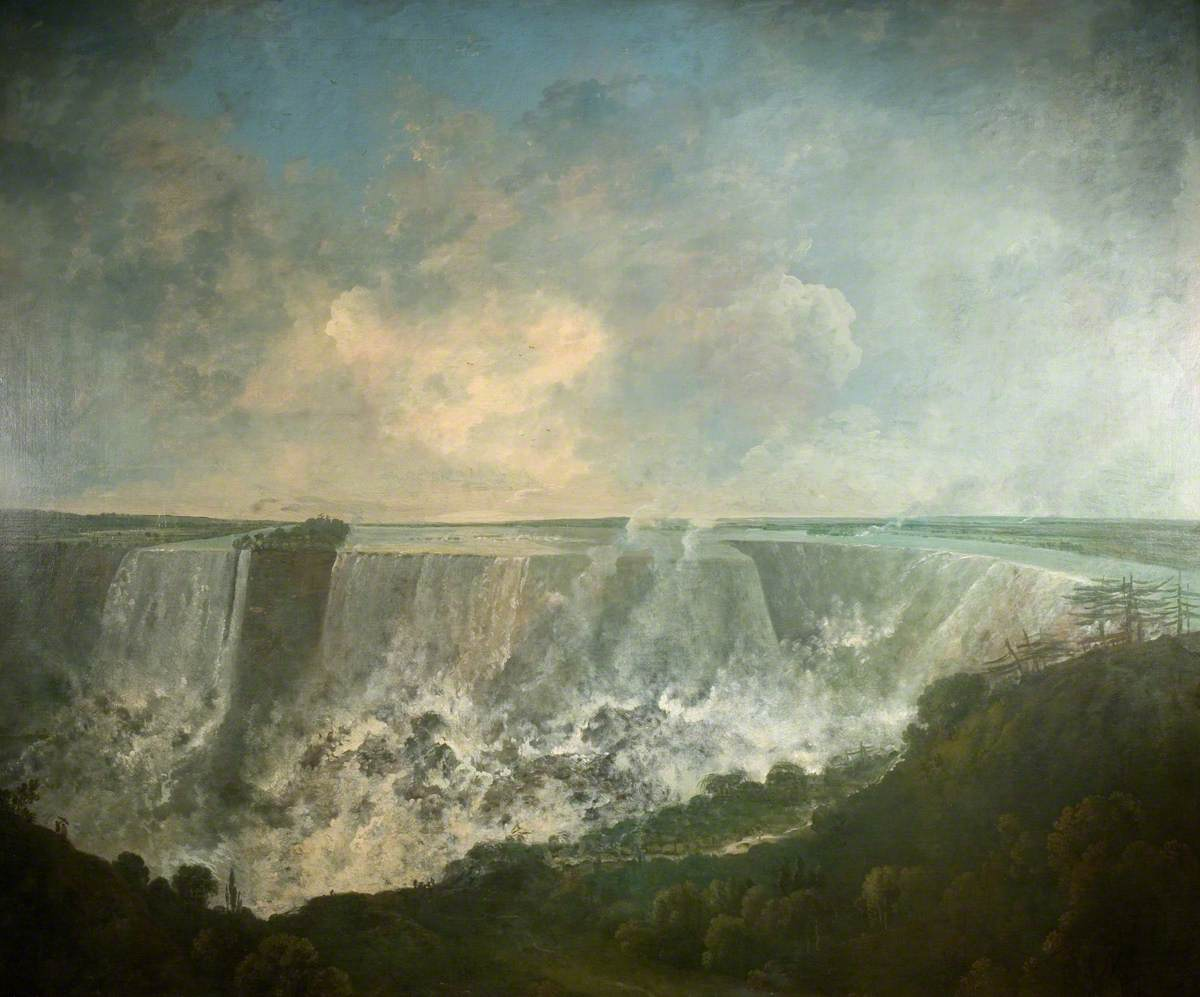
Falls of Niagara by Richard Wilson, 1774

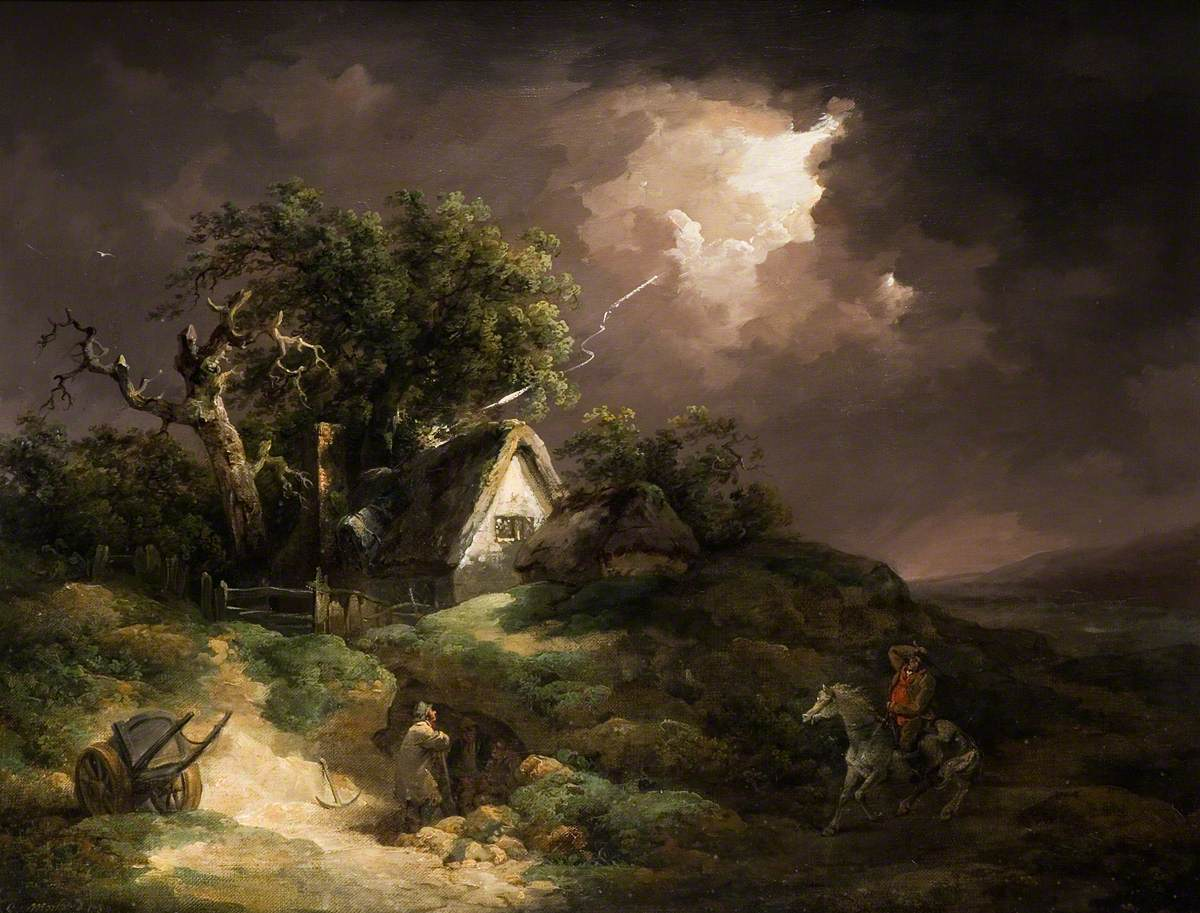
The Coming Storm, Isle of Wight by George Morland, 1789

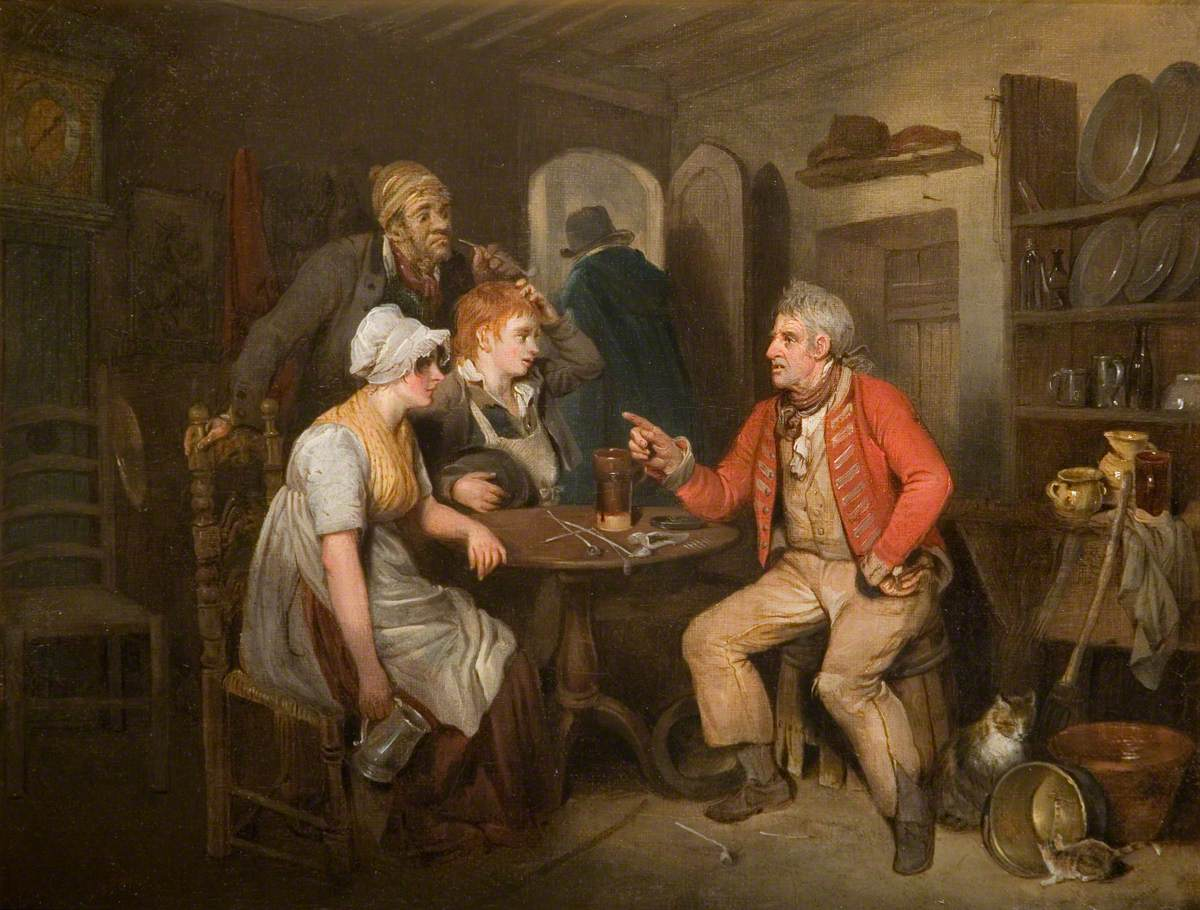
The Old Soldier's Story by Edward Bird, 1808

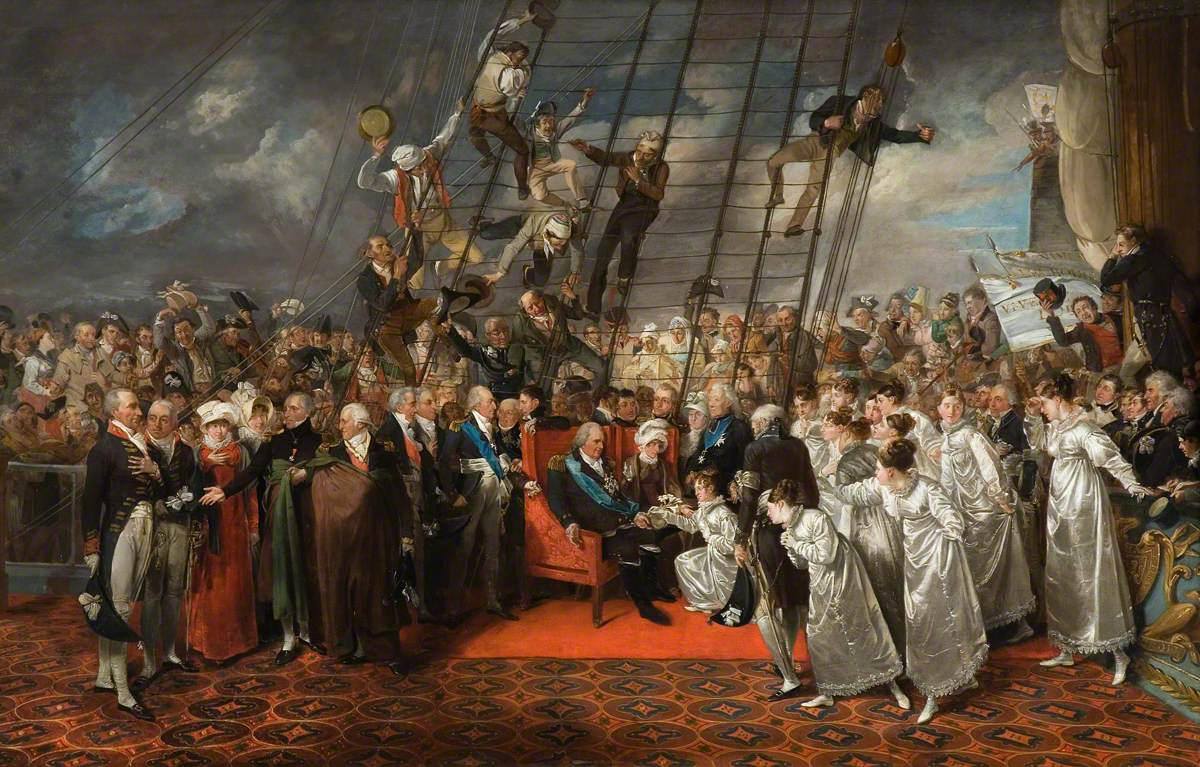
The Arrival of King Louis XVIII of France at Calais by Edward Bird, 1816

Eliza O'Neill as Belvidera by Arthur William Devis, 1816

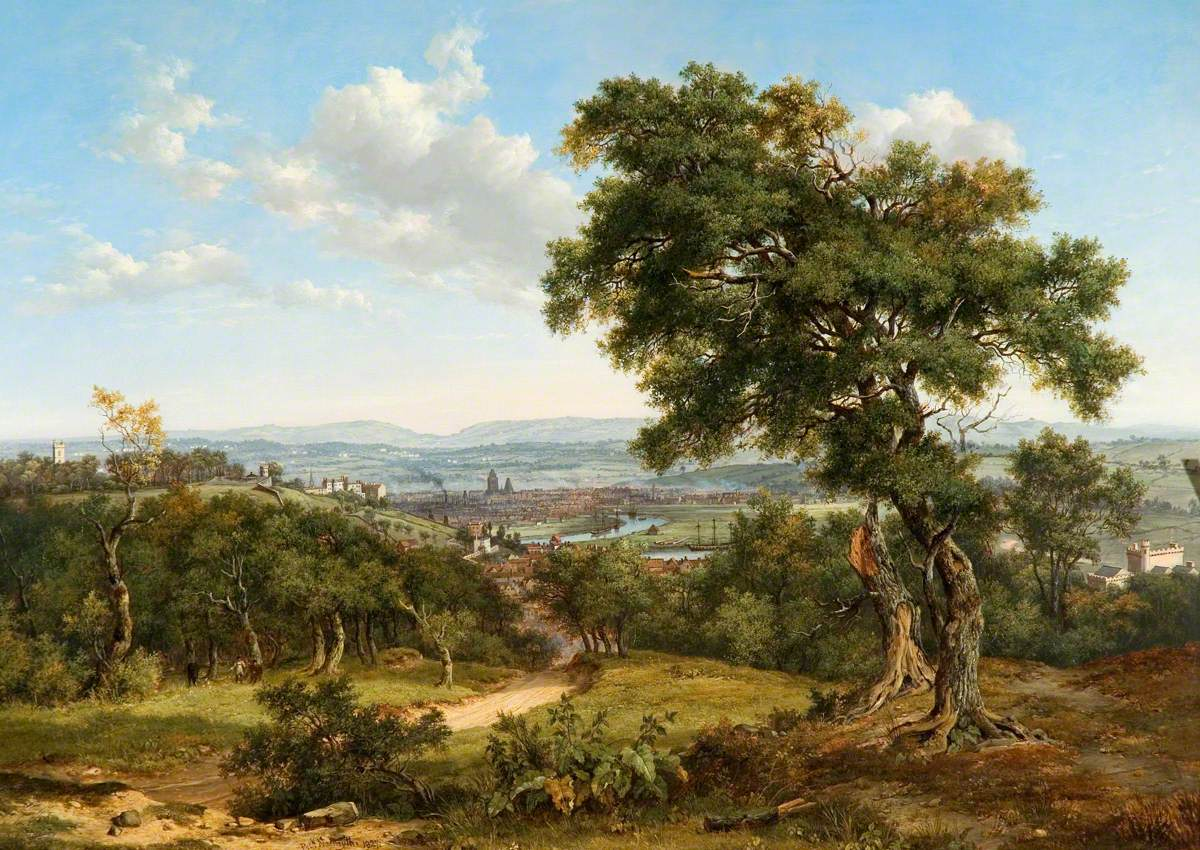
View of Bristol by Patrick Nasmyth, 1827

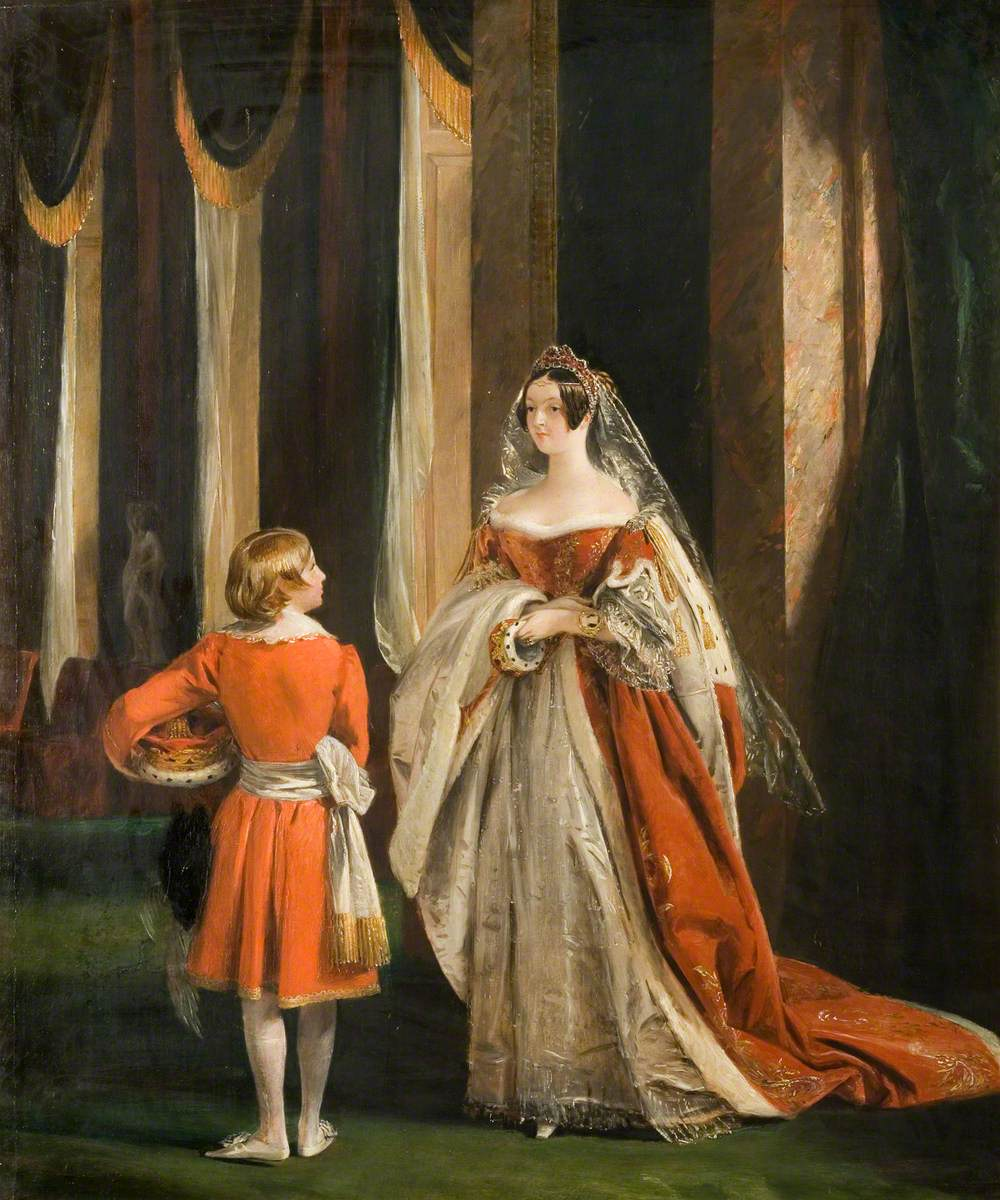
Duchess of Sutherland in Her Coronation Robes by Charles Robert Leslie, 1839

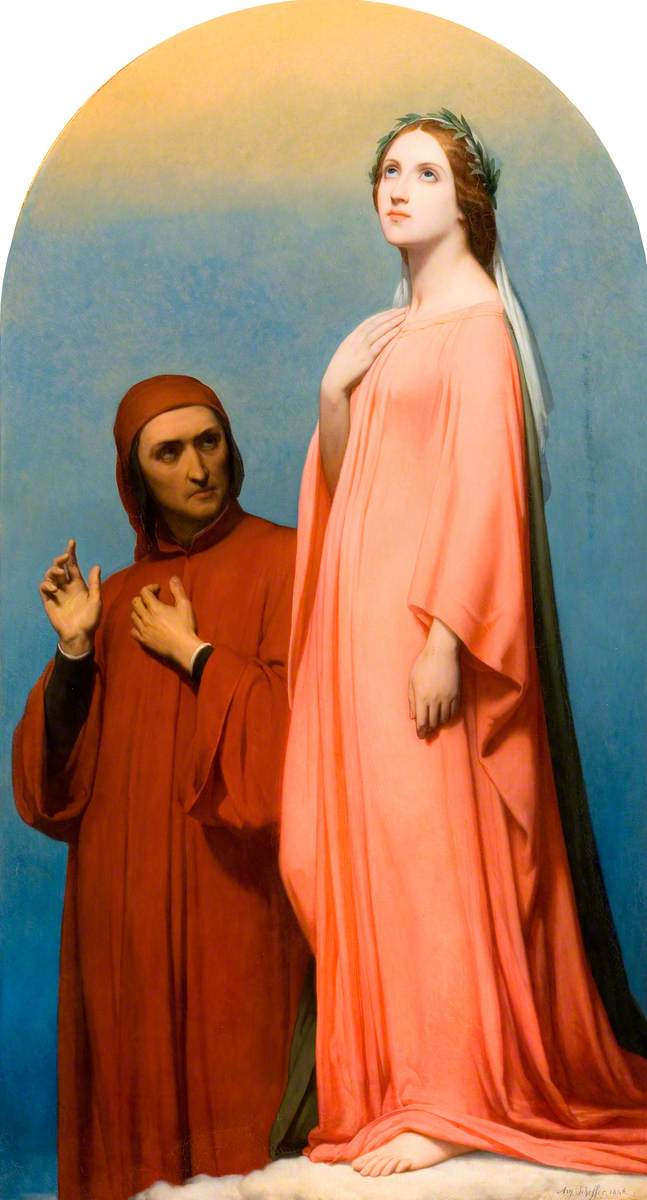
The Vision, Dante and Beatrice by Ary Scheffer, 1846

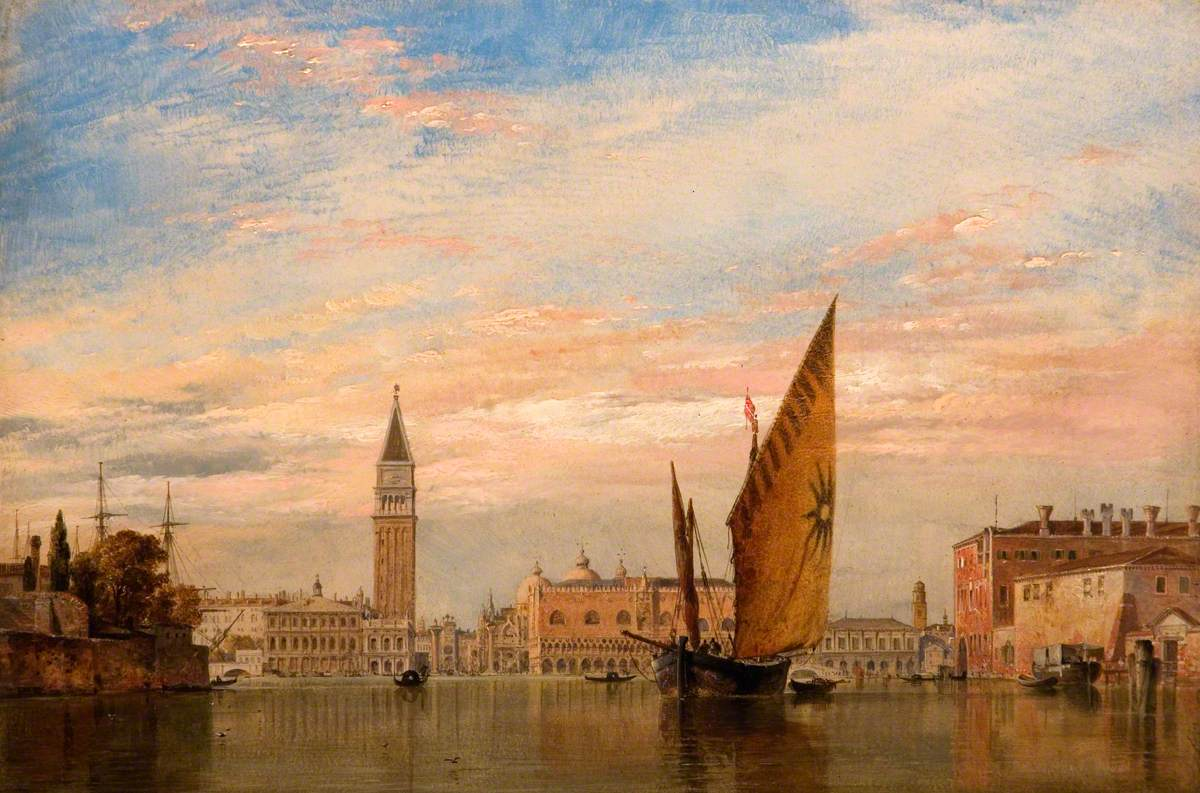
On the Bacino di San Marco, Venice by Edward William Cooke, 1851

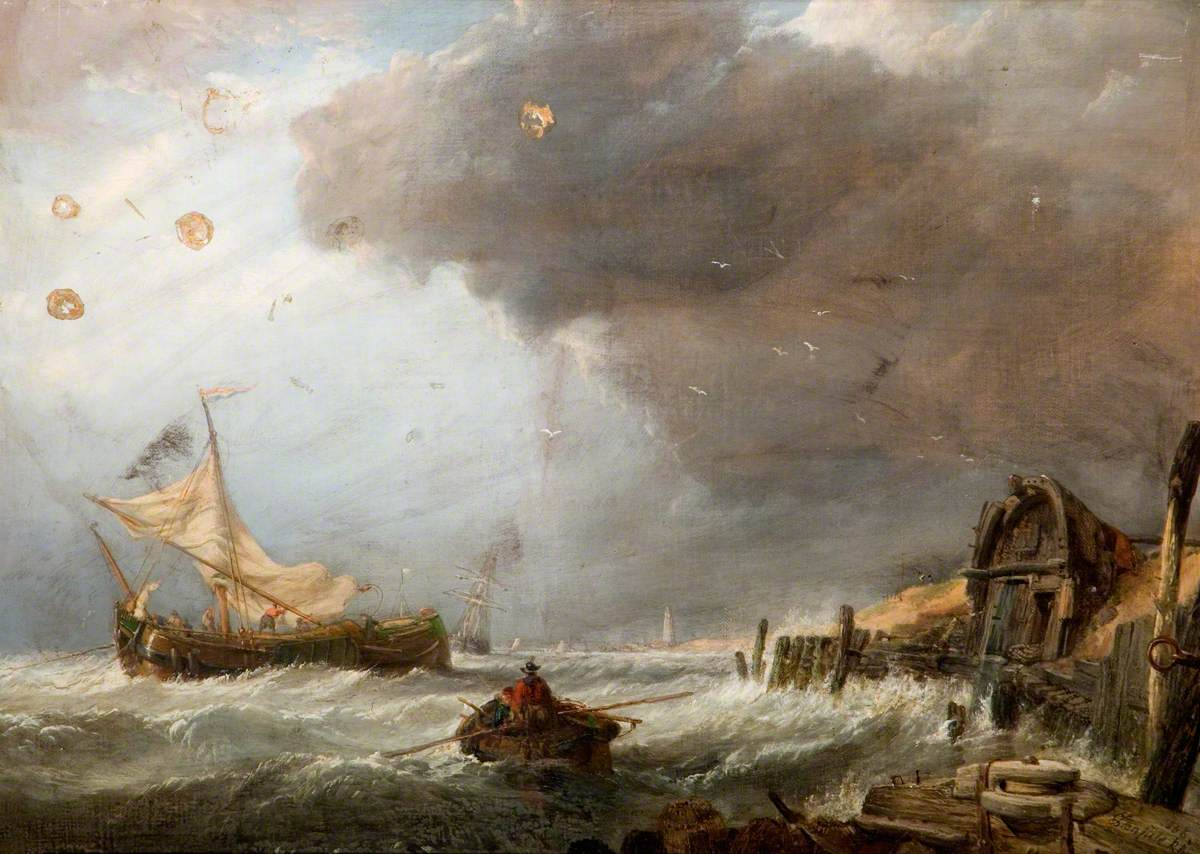
Off Calais by Clarkson Stanfield, 1856

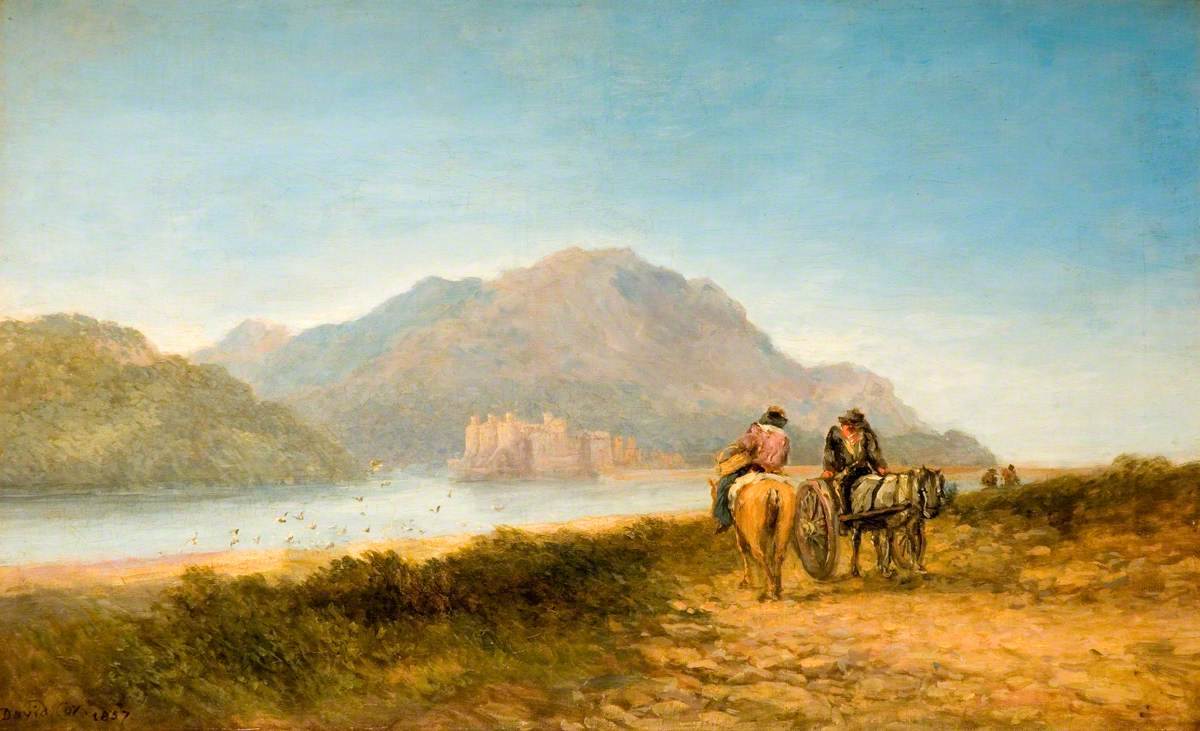
Conway Castle by David Cox, 1857

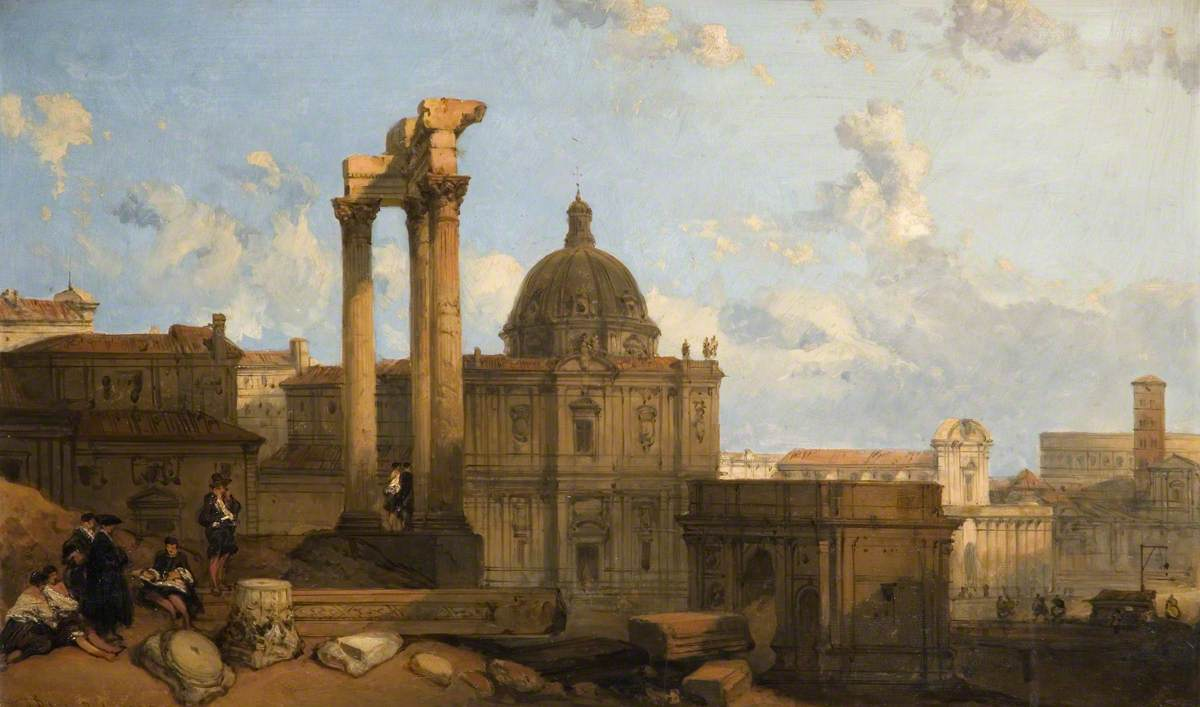
Ruins of the Roman Forum by David Roberts, 1859

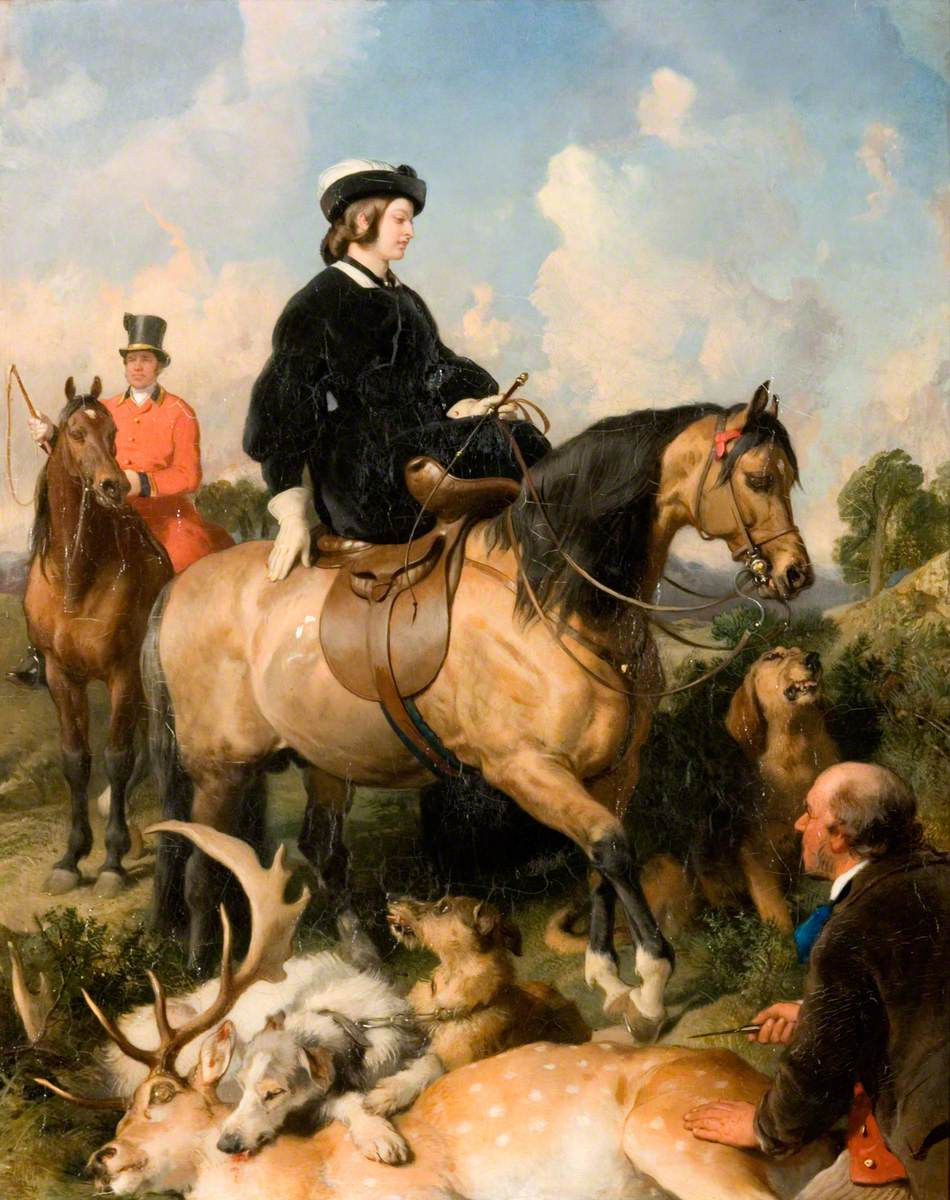
Queen Victoria in Windsor Park by Edwin Landseer, 1865

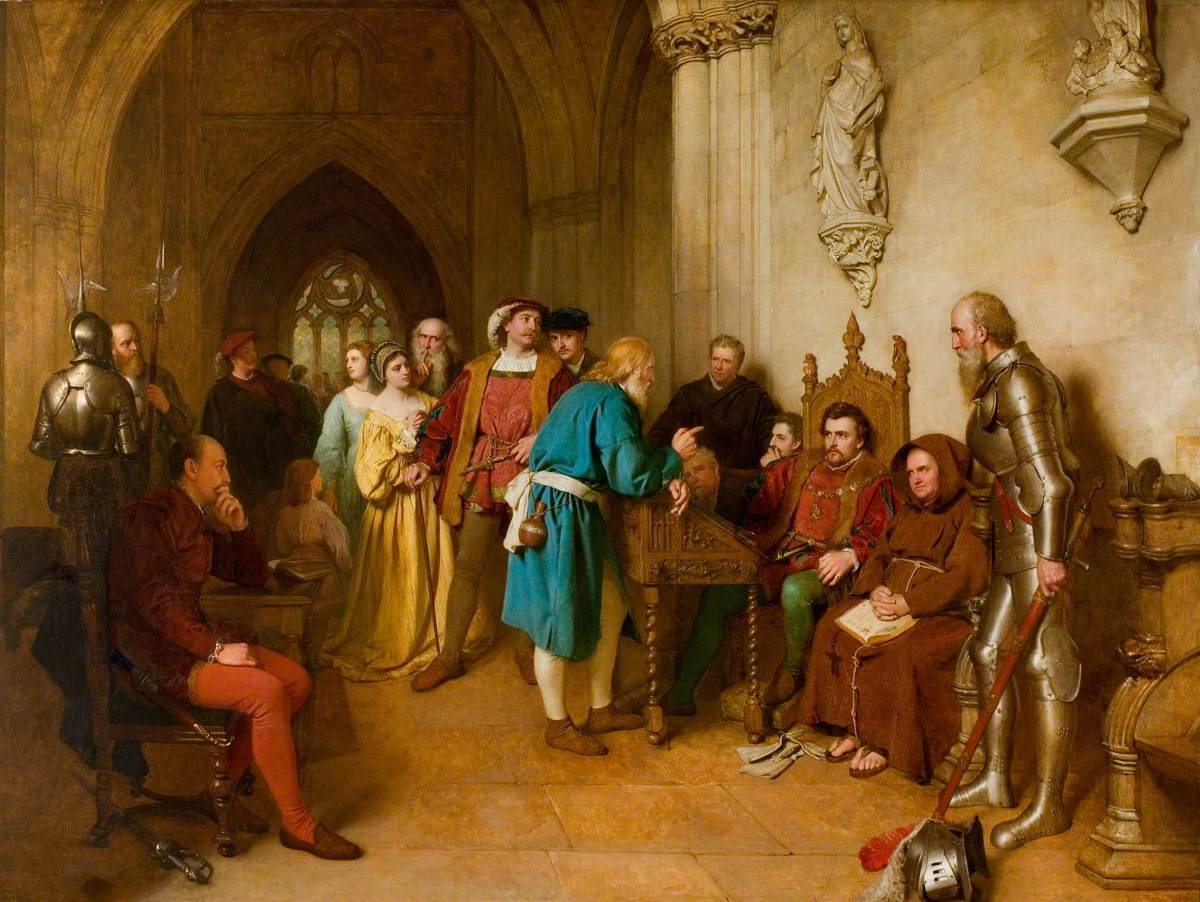
The Warning Before Flodden by John Faed, 1874

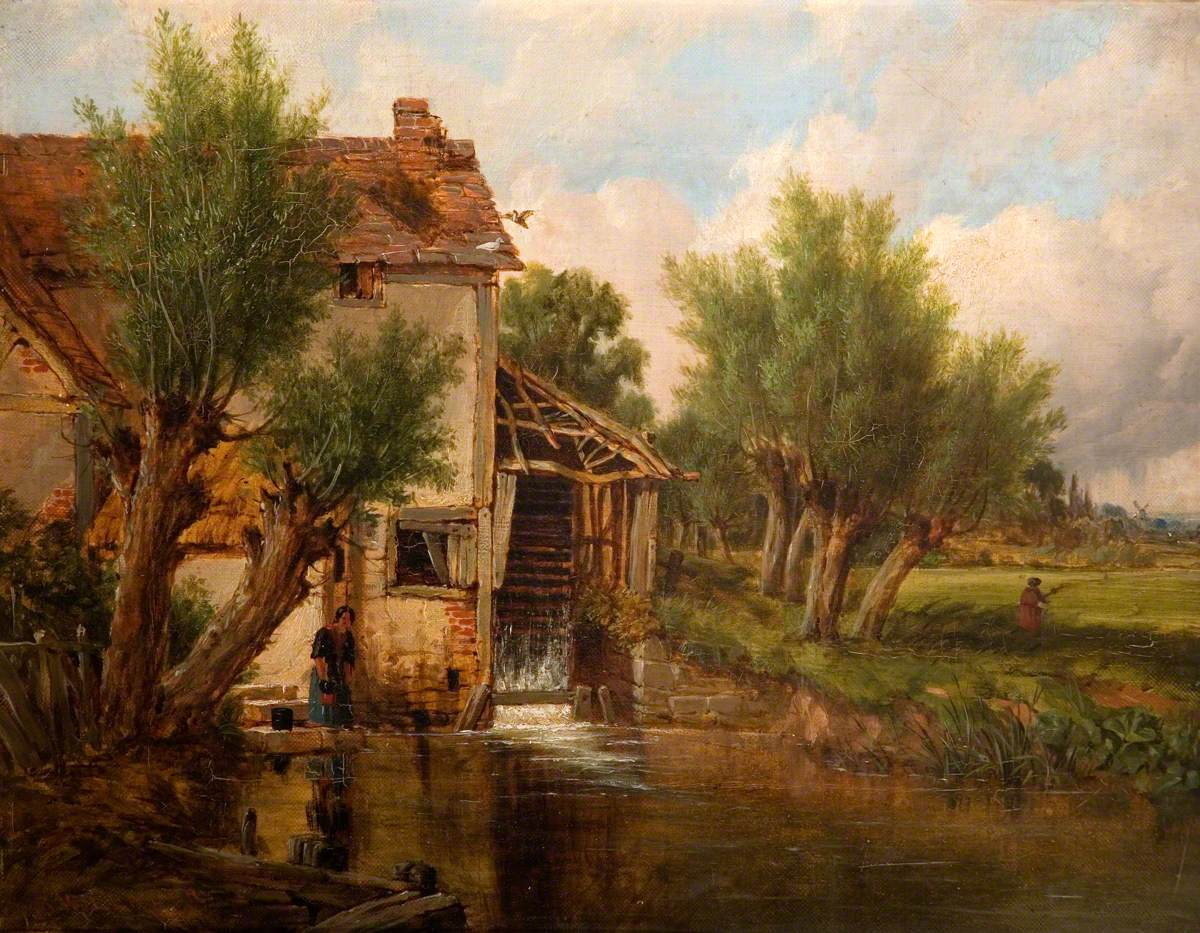
An Old Mill Near Worcester by Benjamin Williams Leader, 1880
