= David Garrick in The Provoked Wife =

Painting by Johan Zoffany

David Garrick in the Provoked Wife
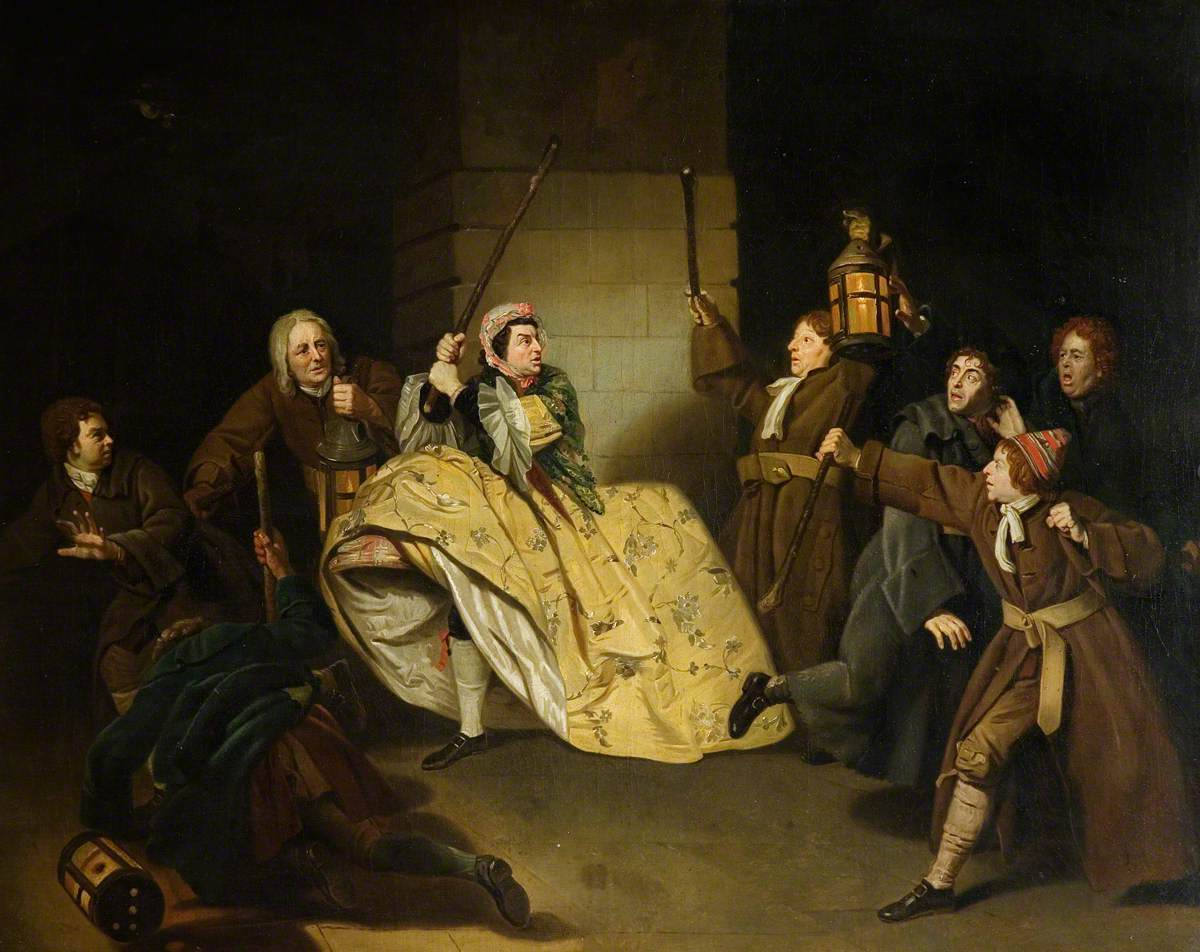
- Version in the Wolverhampton Art Gallery
- Artist: Johan Zoffany
- Year: 1763-1765
- Type: Oil on canvas, genre painting
- Dimensions: 99 cm × 124.5 cm (39 in × 49.0 in)
- Location: Wolverhampton Art Gallery; Wolverhampton

David Garrick in The Provoked Wife is an oil painting on canvas by the German-born British artist Johan Zoffany, from 1763-1765.

== History and description ==
It shows the English stage actor David Garrick in the role of Sir John Brute in the comedy The Provoked Wife by John Vanbrugh. Garrick played the role at the Theatre Royal, Drury Lane in 1763. He is shown dressed in his wife's clothes and about to be arrested by the watch. It was commissioned by Garrick and hung in the dining room at Garrick's Villa in Hampton.

Zoffany built his reputation in Britain through his depictions of Garrick, then the most famous actor in the country. Zoffany became a member of the Royal Academy in 1769 and enjoyed the patronage of George III. Today the painting is in the collection of the Wolverhampton Art Gallery, having been acquired in 1975.

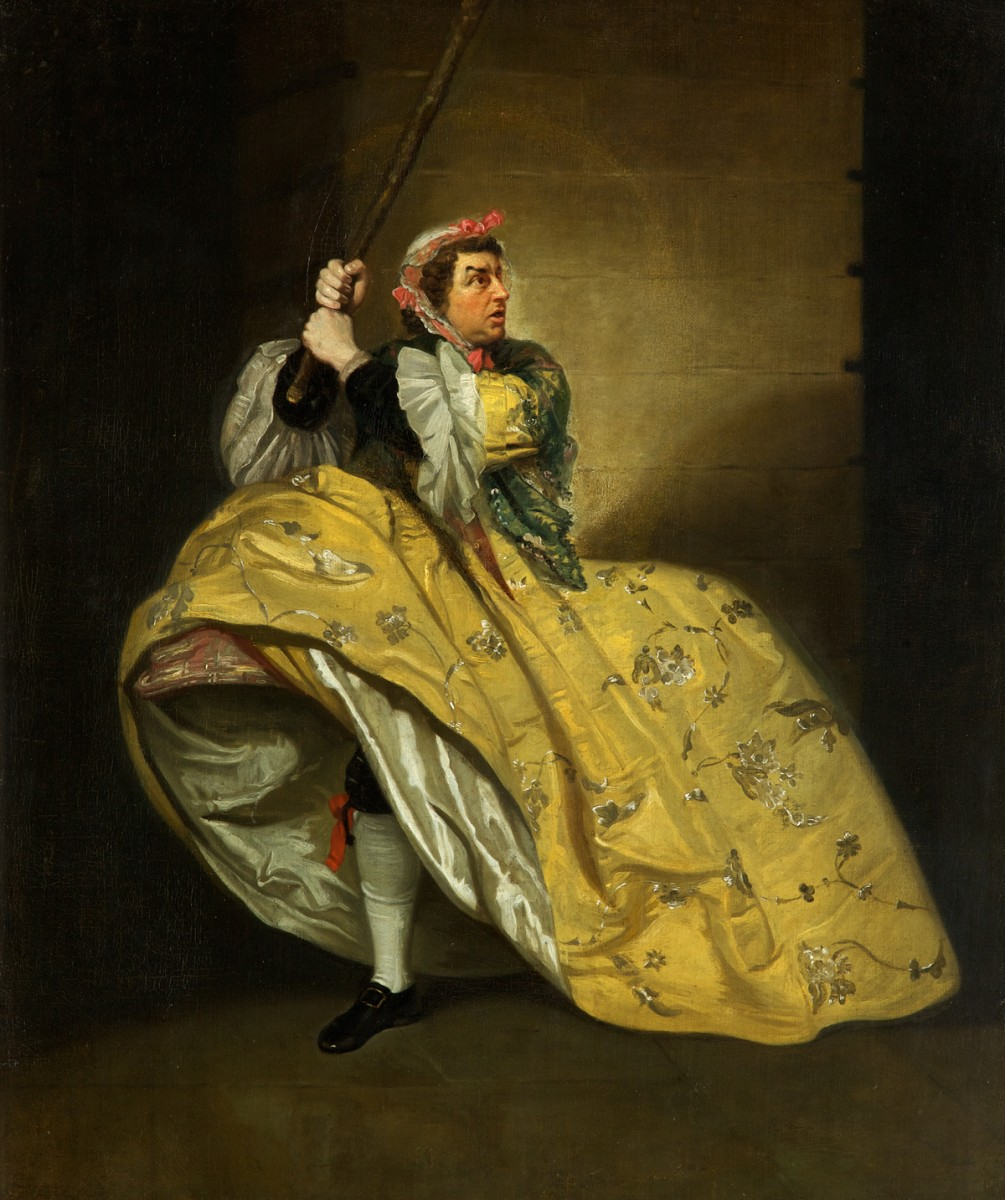
1763 version in the Holbourne Museum

This is a more extensive version of the 1763 painting featuring Garrick only, now in the Holbourne Museum in Bath.

== Bibliography ==
- Waterhouse, Ellis. Painting in Britain, 1530 to 1790. Yale University Press, 1994.
