= George Phoenix =

English painter

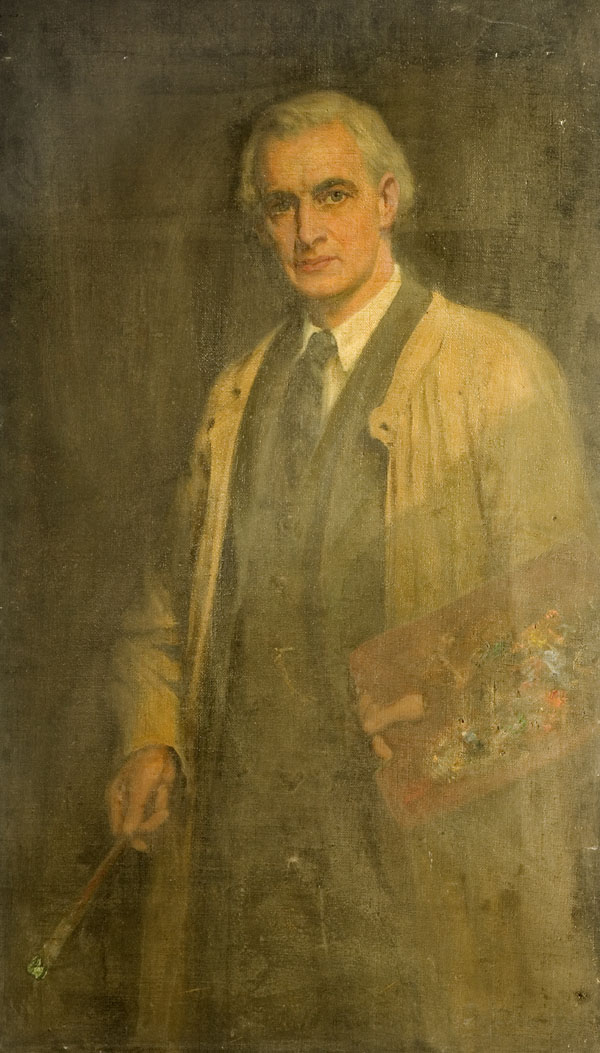
George Phoenix. Self-Portrait. Wolverhampton Art Gallery

George Phoenix (1863–1935) was a British (Victorian/Edwardian) landscape, figurative and portrait artist and sculptor. He regularly exhibited his works in his native Wolverhampton and nationally. They are represented at Wolverhampton Art Gallery and other galleries of the Midlands, and at the National Portrait Gallery.

== Biography ==
George Phoenix was born in 1863 in Wolverhampton, as George Phoenix Edwards, the second of seven surviving children of George William Walter Edwards, a hair-dresser, and his wife Jane, née Phoenix. He studied at the Birmingham School of Art. The 1881 census describes 17-year-old George Edwards as 'an artist (photo)'. At about thus time, he undertook a walking tour in Wales which later he would consider a start of his artistic career.

He definitely lived in London in the late 1880s, as he painted the only known portrait of the artist Henry Mark Anthony. In 1889, when he was in Bournemouth, he started to exhibit. He took as his artistic name the maiden name of his mother, Phoenix, and his paintings are usually signed 'Geo Phoenix'. They were shown at the Royal Academy, the Royal Birmingham Society of Artists, Walker Art Gallery (Liverpool), and the New Gallery. In around 1890 he returned to Wolverhampton and in 1891 married Julia Critchlow (1858–1932). Since then, he lived permanently in Wolverhampton where he maintained a studio in the Merridale Road and then in the Clarendon Street.

=== Work ===
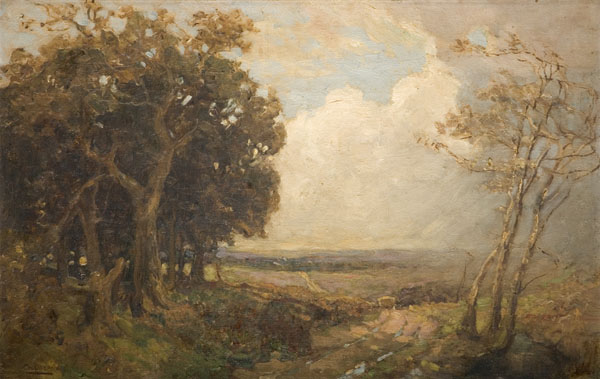
Geo Phoenix.Corner of Cannock Chase (Where the Elves Dwell). Wolverhampton Art Gallery

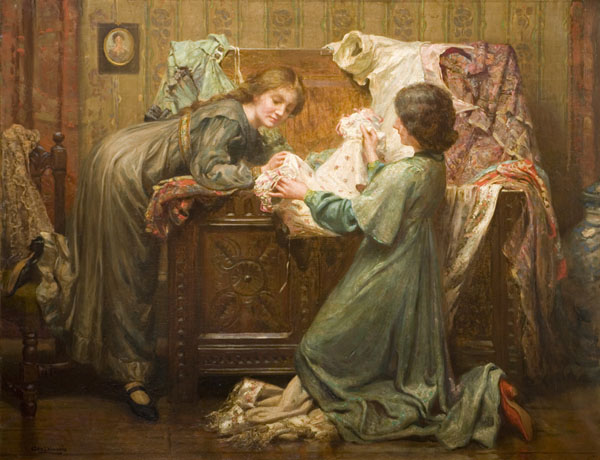
Geo Phoenix. The Grandmother's Wardrobe. 1912. Wolverhampton Art Gallery

Phoenix worked in both oils and watercolours. At the early stage of his artistic career, he was supported and encouraged by Wolverhampton builder and patron of arts Philip Horsman whose posthumous portrait Phoenix painted in 1900 (Wolverhampton Art Gallery). He completed many portraits including these of the Mayors and Town Clerks of Wolverhampton and Bilston, doctors and nurses of South Staffordshire General Hospital (now at New Cross Hospital), Lord Bishop of Lichfield Dr Kempthorne, Sir Charles Tertius Mander and his family, and others. His posthumous portraits of Sister Dora of Walsall and Douglas Harris of Wolverhampton correspond with their sculptural monuments and confirm his relations with sculptors Francis John Williamson (1833–1920) and Robert Jackson Emerson (1878–1944). His landscape paintings depicting mainly English countryside - Bridgnorth, Ludlow, Lincoln - were much influenced by Henry Mark Anthony. He also painted landscapes of Normandy and Holland. He often painted 'old Wolverhampton'. In 1922, his large-scale painting 'The Old Hill, Tettenhall' was presented to Wolverhampton Art Gallery by subscription.

Several religious paintings are known, among them - 'The Spirit of Christ' which was shown at his solo exhibition in 1927, and 'The Prodigal Son' (now at Wolverhampton Art Gallery). As an illustrator, he contributed drawings and cartoons to 'Punch'.

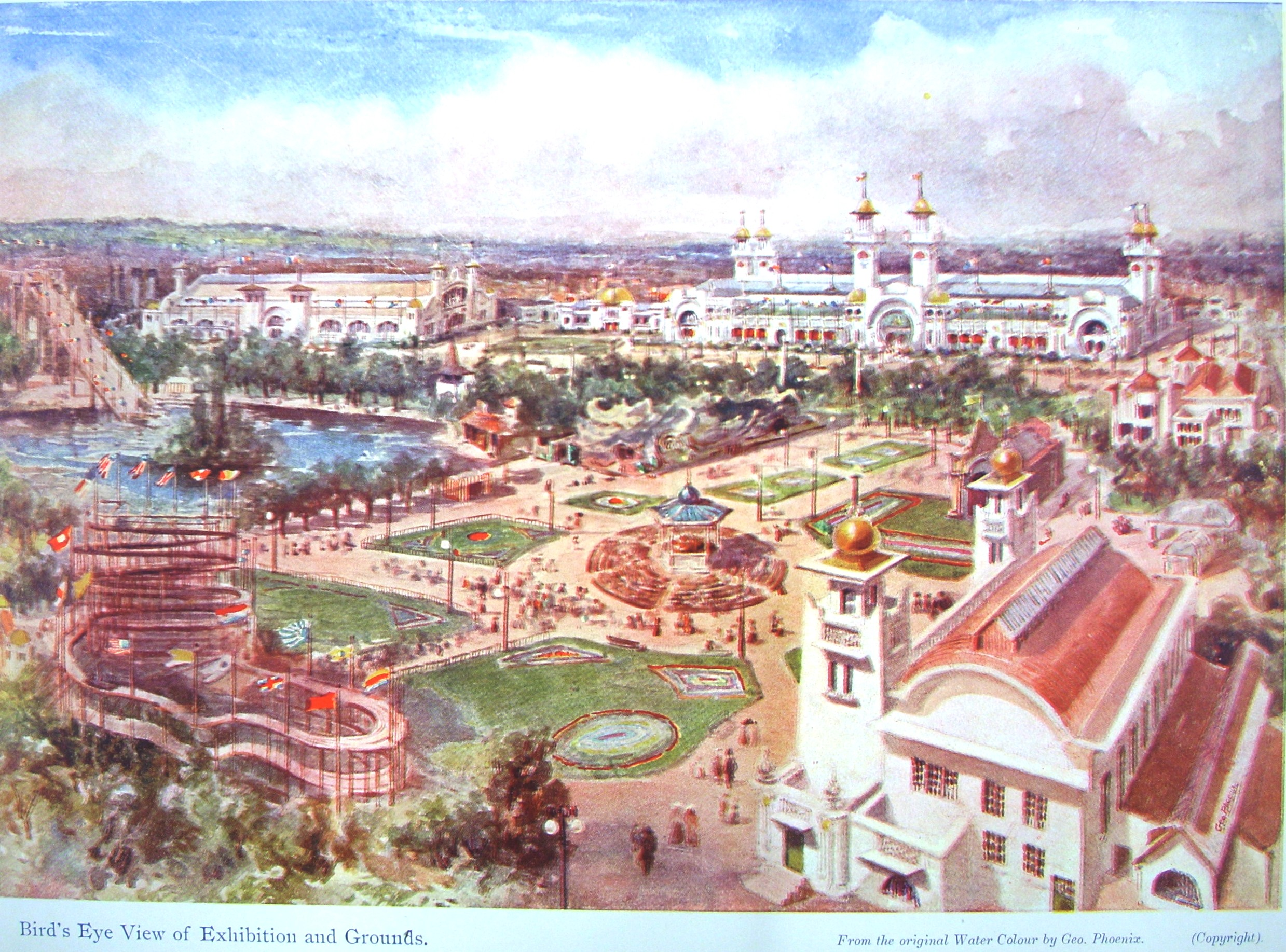
Geo Phoenix. The Bird Eye View of the 1902 Wolverhampton Art and Industrial Exhibition.

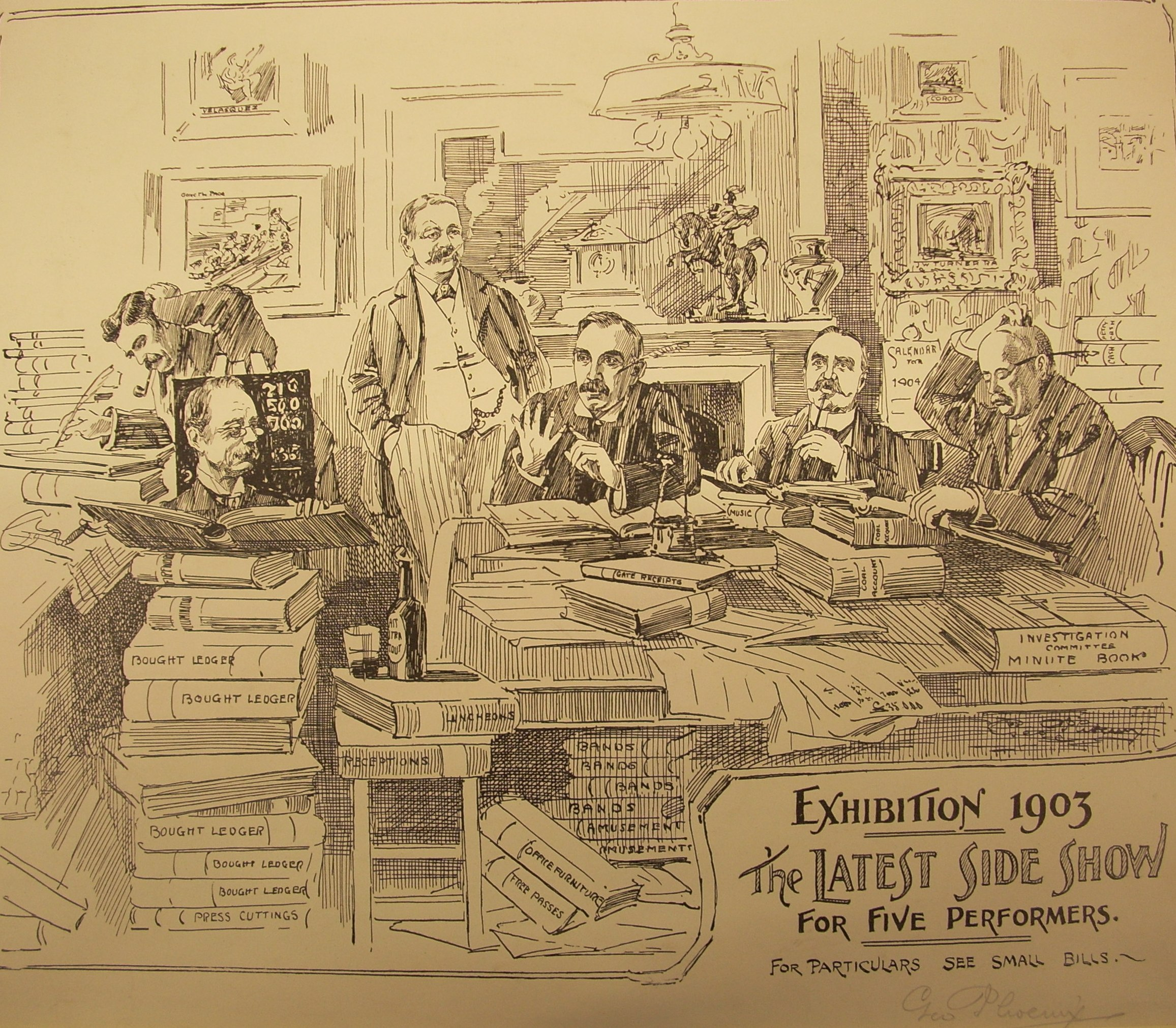
Geo Phoenix. Cartoon 'Exhibition 1903. The Latest Side Show for Five Performers'. 1903.Wolverhampton Art Gallery

Geo Phoenix was a well-known, respected, and active member of the local society. He participated in the organisation of the Wolverhampton Art and Industrial Exhibition in 1902 and created its large-scale pictorial panorama. A souvenir album of the Exhibition was illustrated with his watercolour. His humorous cartoons depicting the main organisers of the Exhibition have been preserved at Wolverhampton Art Gallery. In 1922, Phoenix presented six his paintings to the Gallery as his personal tribute to the survivors of the Great War (The World War I). Among them was the painting 'The Grandmother's Wardrobe' (1912) which was considered the best Phoenix' work.

=== Writing ===
In 1907, he wrote a book ‘Wolverhampton Art Gallery Pictures’ which became the first guide-book of Wolverhampton Art Gallery. Written in a form of a conversation with a lady-friend, it provides useful information about the ways of local art patronage, early years of Wolverhampton Art Gallery and art criticism of the Edwardian period. Several Phoenix' remarks on art in Wolverhampton and events at Wolverhampton Art Gallery can be found on the pages of a local newspaper 'Express & Star'.

=== Exhibitions ===
Geo Phoenix regularly participated in Wolverhampton Art exhibitions. His solo show in 1927 included more than one hundred paintings and works on paper from Wolverhampton Art Gallery and private collections, and a sculpture bust of Wolverhampton industrialist A Hickman. In local press, the exhibition was described as demonstrating "versatility, imagination and craftsmanship". Another show was organised in 1932 to celebrate 50 years of his artistic career. At that time, it was noticed that his late paintings demonstrated his strong inclination to the religious subjects, but those were inferior in comparison to his early landscapes. George Phoenix' death in 1935 was also marked by a memorial exhibition at Wolverhampton Art Gallery.

== Literature ==
- Geo. Phoenix. Wolverhampton Art Gallery Pictures. Wolverhampton [no date, c.1907].
- Graves, Algernon. The Royal Academy of Arts Exhibitors. V.3.
- Morris Sidney, Morris Kathleen. A Catalogue of Birmingham & West Midlands Painters of the Nineteenth Century. 1974.
