= Henry Mark Anthony =

English painter

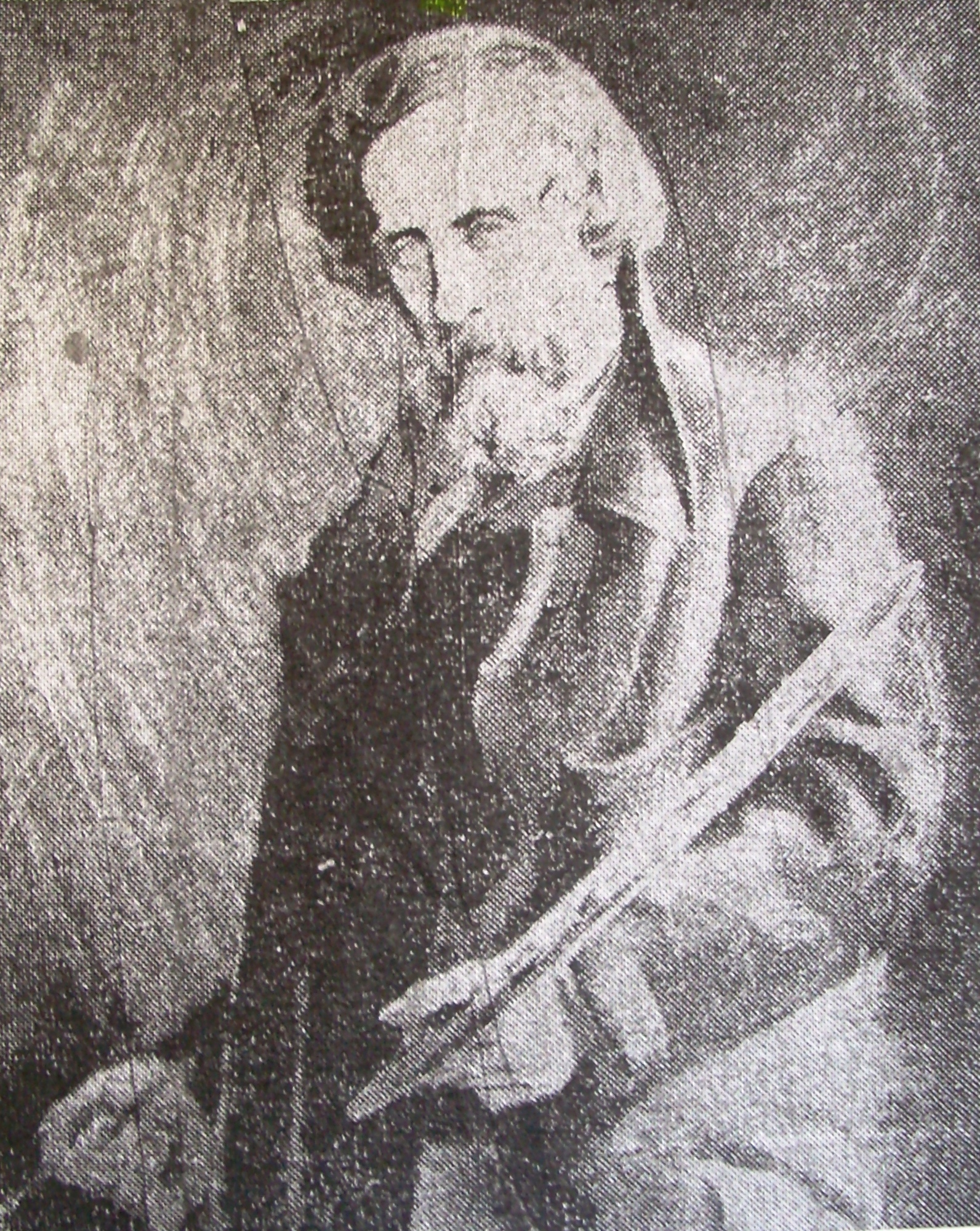
George Phoenix. Portrait of Henry Mark Anthony. 1880s. Present location unknown

Henry Mark Anthony (4 August 1817 – 1 December 1886) was an English landscape artist, often favourably compared to John Constable by critics. He exhibited at many major art institutions and travelled widely, being credited with introducing the en plein air style of painting to Britain.

== Life and work ==
Anthony was born at Rusholme Lane, Manchester, of Welsh ancestry, and was the second son of John Anthony, merchant, and his wife, Phoebe. The family moved to Cowbridge, Glamorgan (in Wales), around 1823.

Anthony was apprenticed to a doctor called Harrison who, being an amateur artist himself, encouraged his artistic leanings. Subsequently he is reported to have been a pupil of his cousin George Wilfred Anthony, a drawing-master in Manchester (later a landscape painter and art critic - as Gabriel Tinto - for the Manchester Guardian).

Anthony moved to London around 1833. Patronage and a legacy received in the 1830s, allowed him to travel. Thus he studied at The Hague, in Paris, at the Académie des Beaux-Arts with Paul Delaroche, Ary Scheffer, and Horace Vernet, and in Fontainebleau in 1837, where he was influenced by the Barbizon school, Jean-Baptiste-Camille Corot, and Jules Dupré.

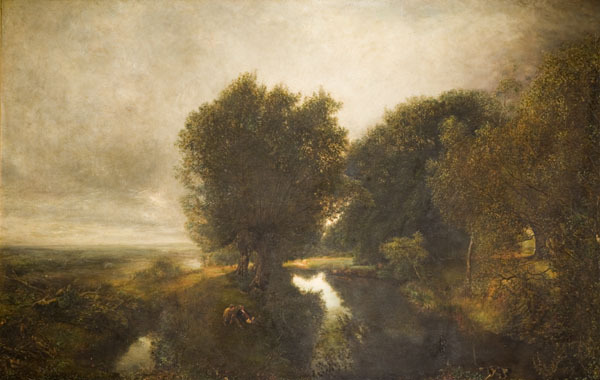
Henry Mark Anthony. Nature's Mirror. 1854

Anthony was among the first British artists to introduce the French style of plein-air landscape painting to London. He exhibited regularly at the Royal Academy, between 1837 and 1884, the British Institution (1841–60), and the Society of British Artists (1841–69). He was elected a member of the latter in 1845, resigning in 1852 in the hope that it would assist his election to associateship of the Royal Academy. In 1843 he showed one of his paintings at the Royal Birmingham Society of Artists (RBSA) and in the same year was elected its member. He also exhibited once at the Grosvenor Gallery and the Liverpool Academy, winning the 1854 prize of £50 for Nature's Mirror (Wolverhampton Art Gallery). He travelled and painted in England and Wales, France, the Netherlands, Ireland, and Spain.

At the time, Anthony was considered the second best British landscape artist after John Constable. Working directly from nature, he painted on the large scale, introducing into painted landscape melancholic mood, nostalgic feelings, and atmospheric effects often enhanced by the light of dawn or early evening over an old church or castle. However, new developments in British art after 1860, and his failure to be elected to the Royal Academy, led to a solitary later career.

=== Relationship with other artists ===
Anthony was admired by the Pre-Raphaelite Brotherhood (attending their ‘house-warming’ at Newman Street, London, on 12 January 1850). William Michael Rossetti praised his landscapes in 'The Spectator' and 'Critic' and later wrote: "The works which Anthony produced between some such dates as 1847 and 1857, were certainly very remarkable, and stood out saliently from the throng." Anthony was a close friend of Ford Madox Brown, mentioned frequently in Brown's diaries - in 1851, the two artists undertook a walking tour of the Isle of Wight. Dante Gabriel Rossetti helped to secure Anthony the patronage of the important Newcastle collector James Leathart in the 1860s. At about the same time, Anthony corresponded with the famous Birmingham pen-maker and art patron Joseph Gillott (1799–1872). He intended to buy from Gillott musical instrument in exchange for cash or one of his paintings. Anthony's art dealer was Sergeant Ralph Thomas who was said to pay Anthony "sixpence a minute" for his pictures and owned about one hundred sketches by him.

Anthony's only known portrait was painted by George Phoenix (1863–1935). It was on loan from Phoenix to Wolverhampton Art Gallery until 1931, when it was returned to Anthony's descendants.

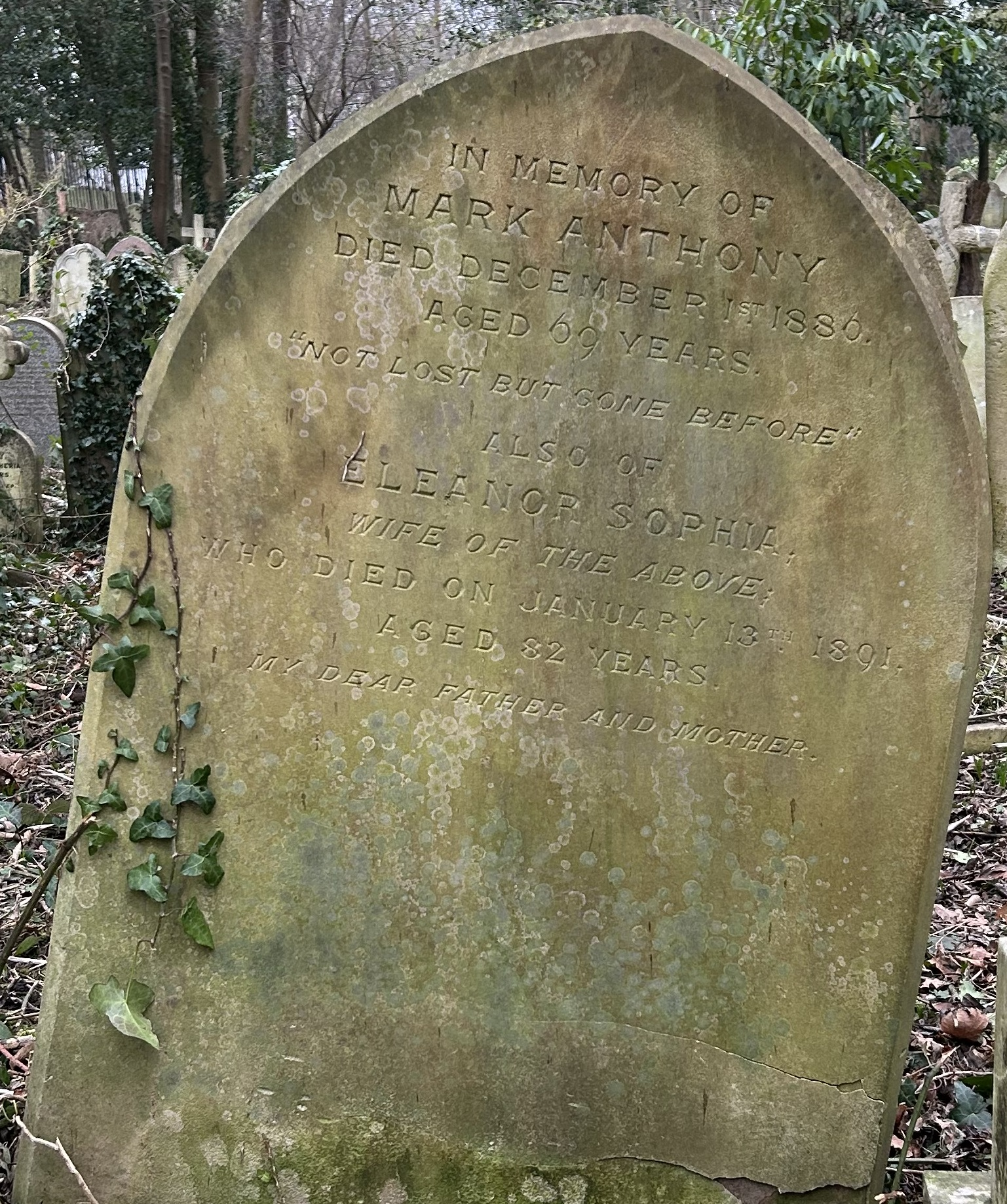
Grave of Henry Mark Anthony in Highgate Cemetery

=== Family ===
Anthony married Eleanor Sophia Marshall (c.1809/1816-1891) and had at least three daughters: Phoebe Grace (1850 – after 1901), Constance (b. 1852) and Grace (b. 1853, married 1869). One of his cousins was George Wilfred Anthony, drawing master, landscape painter and art critic.

=== Death and legacy ===
Henry Mark Anthony died in London at The Lawn, Hampstead, on 1 December 1886. He was buried on the eastern side of Highgate Cemetery. A number of his paintings were subsequently purchased by Wolverhampton postmaster George Fardo. Eventually he passed these paintings to Philip Horsman, Wolverhampton builder and art collector. They are now in the collection of Wolverhampton Art Gallery. The local artist George Phoenix commented on them in 1907: "Whatever he (HM Anthony) worth doing, he considered worth doing well; doing with all his heart and with all his soul."
