= Ruins of the Roman Forum =

Painting by David Roberts

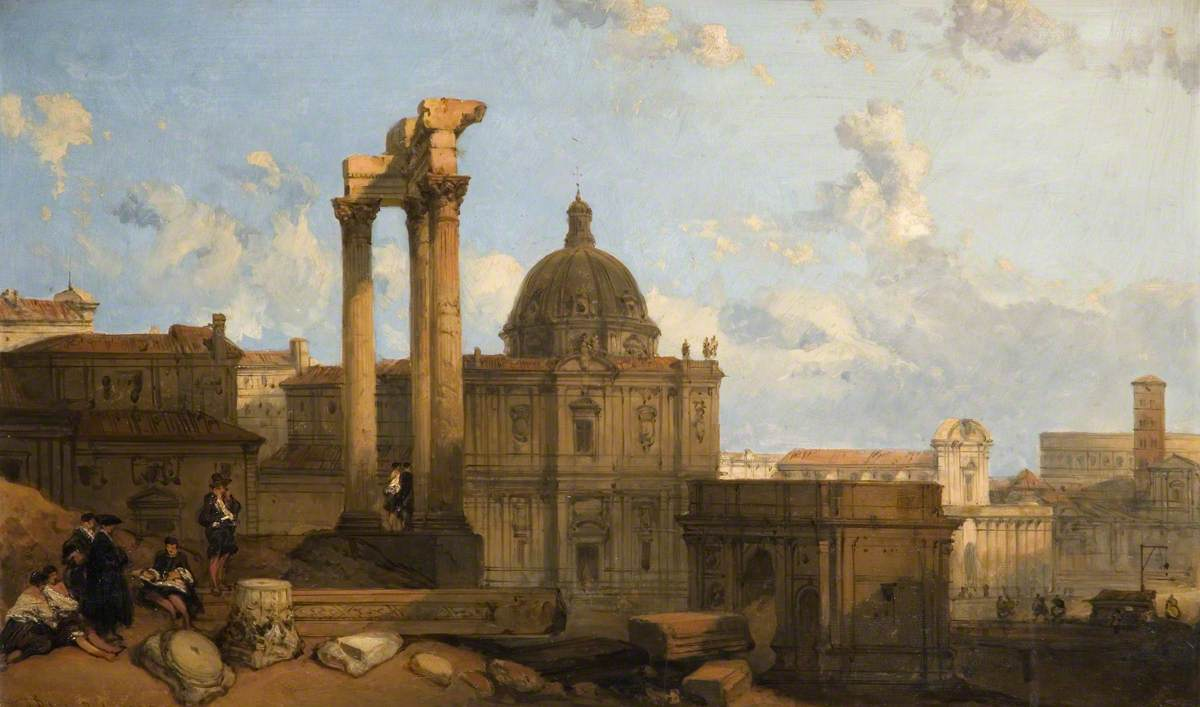
- Artist: David Roberts
- Year: 1859
- Type: Oil on panel, landscape painting
- Dimensions: 38.5 cm × 62.5 cm (15.2 in × 24.6 in)
- Location: Wolverhampton Art Gallery, Wolverhampton

Ruins of the Roman Forum is an 1859 landscape painting by the British artist David Roberts. It depicts the remains of the Roman Forum In Victorian era Rome. Although he became best known for his Orientalist paintings of the Middle East, he also produced many works depicting Italy and Spain. Rome was a popular subject for British artists in the nineteenth century and Roberts painter it numerous times. Today the painting is in the collection of the Wolverhampton Art Gallery, bequeathed by Maria Christiana Cartwright in 1887.

== Bibliography ==
- Sim, Katherine. David Roberts R.A., 1796–1864: A Biography. Quartet Books, 1984.
