= Edwin Butler Bayliss =

English artist

Edwin Butler Bayliss (1874–1950), was an English artist based in the Black Country, famous for his realistic and unsentimental paintings of industrial sites in the area.

== Early life and education ==
Edwin was born in Wolverhampton, on Merridale Road, the eldest son of Samuel Bayliss (b. 1848, an industrialist and director of the firm Bayliss, Jones and Bayliss) and Emma Bayliss (née Butler, b.1849). He spent his childhood in Finchfield and Tettenhall, Wolverhampton. From twelve he attended the Rydal Mount School (now named the Rydal Penrhos School), a boarding school in Colwyn Bay, Wales where he became a prefect.

== Return to the Black Country ==
At eighteen he returned to his family's large house in Tettenhall, The Woodhouse. He joined his father's manufacturing firm, but at twenty-seven he had left to pursue his artistic ambitions. He painted works inspired by scenes from both his father's iron foundry and the steel works of Sir Alfred Hickman, 1st Baronet, who was a friend of his father's.

== Work ==
Edwin was originally self-taught, he seems to have no formal art training except for learning basic techniques by his friend and fellow artist, Joseph Vickers de Ville. He sketches in charcoal, pastel and watercolour and painting mainly in oil. He was a prolific painter, a competent etcher, and apparently a sculptor too, though no examples of his sculpture are known. He exhibited his images of the Black Country from 1904 until his death and a large amount of his work is held by Wolverhampton Art Gallery.
