= John Fullwood =

British landscape painter, etcher and illustrator (1854–1931)

- Born: 1854; Wolverhampton, England
- Died: 1931 (aged 76–77)
- Education: Birmingham School of Art
- Known for: Painting, etching, illustration
- Movement: Landscape art

John Fullwood (1854–1931) was an English landscape painter and etcher.

== Biography ==
Fullwood was born in Wolverhampton and studied at the Birmingham School of Art. He was a founding member of the Newlyn Art Colony and exhibited regularly at major British institutions in the late 19th and early 20th centuries.

He exhibited at the Royal Society of British Artists and the Royal Birmingham Society of Artists and was elected a member of both in 1891.
