= The Provoked Wife =

1697 English comedy play by John Vanbrugh

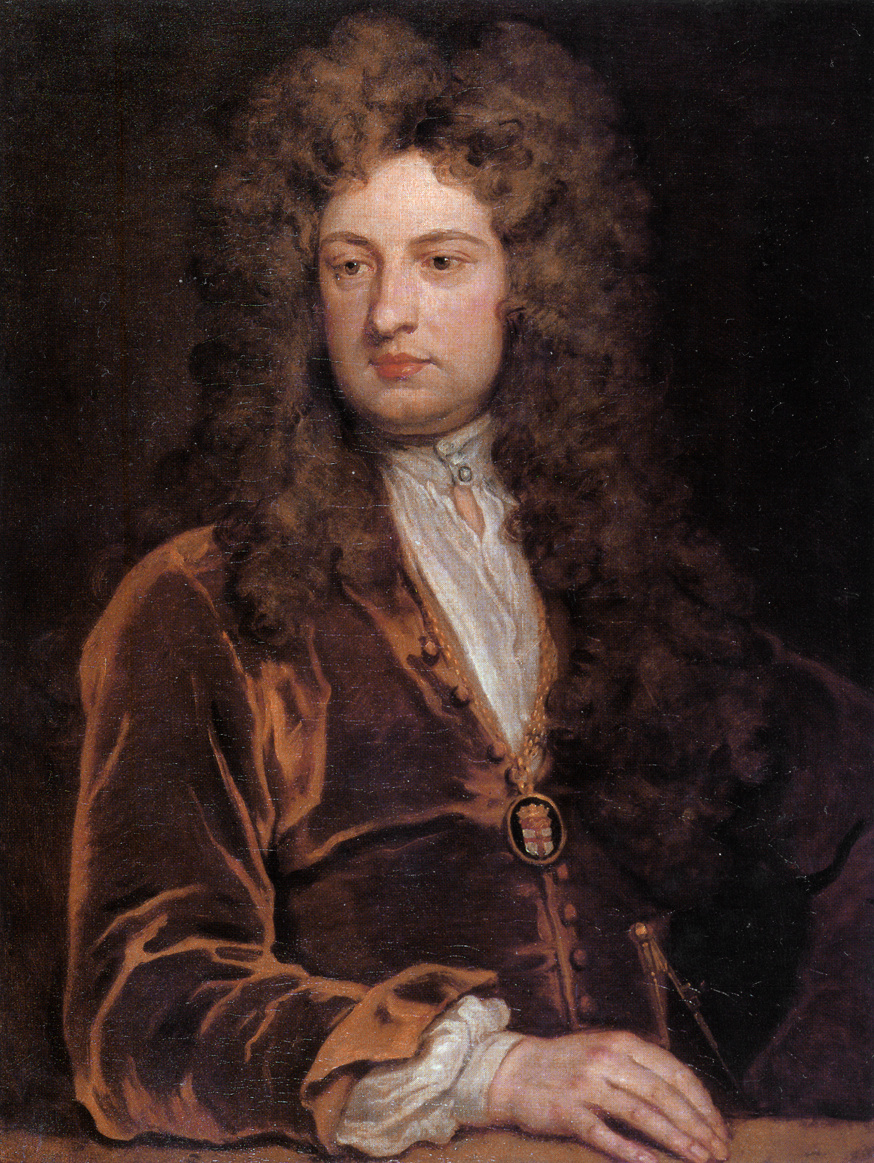
John Vanbrugh (1664–1726), author of The Relapse

The Provoked Wife (1697) is the second original comedy written by John Vanbrugh. It made its first appearance in Lincoln's Inn Fields in May, 1697. The premise of the plot, of a wife trapped in an abusive marriage considering either leaving it or taking a lover, outraged some sections of Restoration society. A later unfinished play by Vanbrugh was completed by Colley Cibber and staged under the title The Provoked Husband in 1728.

== Plot ==
The hitherto virtuous Lady Brute is provoked to infidelity by her sour husband Sir John Brute. Married in haste – she for money, he for sex – the Brutes are shackled by wedlock but looking for diversions. He goes off for a drunken night on the town and ends up before a magistrate, disguised in a priest's habit stolen from a tailor.

Meanwhile, Lady Brute and her niece Belinda dress as Shepherd Market doxies for a secret tryst with their suitors Heartfree and Constant and are spied on by the envious Lady Fanciful, who wants Heartfree for herself. Belinda, despite interference from Lady Fanciful, wins her man and marries for love. It ends sadly for the boozy Brute who attempts to rape his wife, discovers two gallants lurking in his wardrobe and finally ends up accepting certain situations rather than becoming a human pincushion, i.e., fighting a duel to satisfy his honour.

== Analysis ==
Writer and Professor of English Frank McCormick raises doubt on the often-repeated claim that Vanbrugh wrote part of his comedy The Provoked Wife in the Bastille being based on allusions in a couple of much later memoirs. It is different in tone from his first play, the largely farcical 1696 comedy The Relapse, and adapted to the greater acting skills of the new company of actors chosen for its premiere, who walked out not long before in a dispute with management.

The actors' co-operative boasted the established star performers of the age, and Vanbrugh tailored The Provoked Wife to their specialities. While The Relapse had been robustly phrased to be suitable for amateurs and minor acting talents, he could count on versatile professionals like Thomas Betterton, Elizabeth Barry and the rising young star Anne Bracegirdle to do justice to characters of depth and nuance.

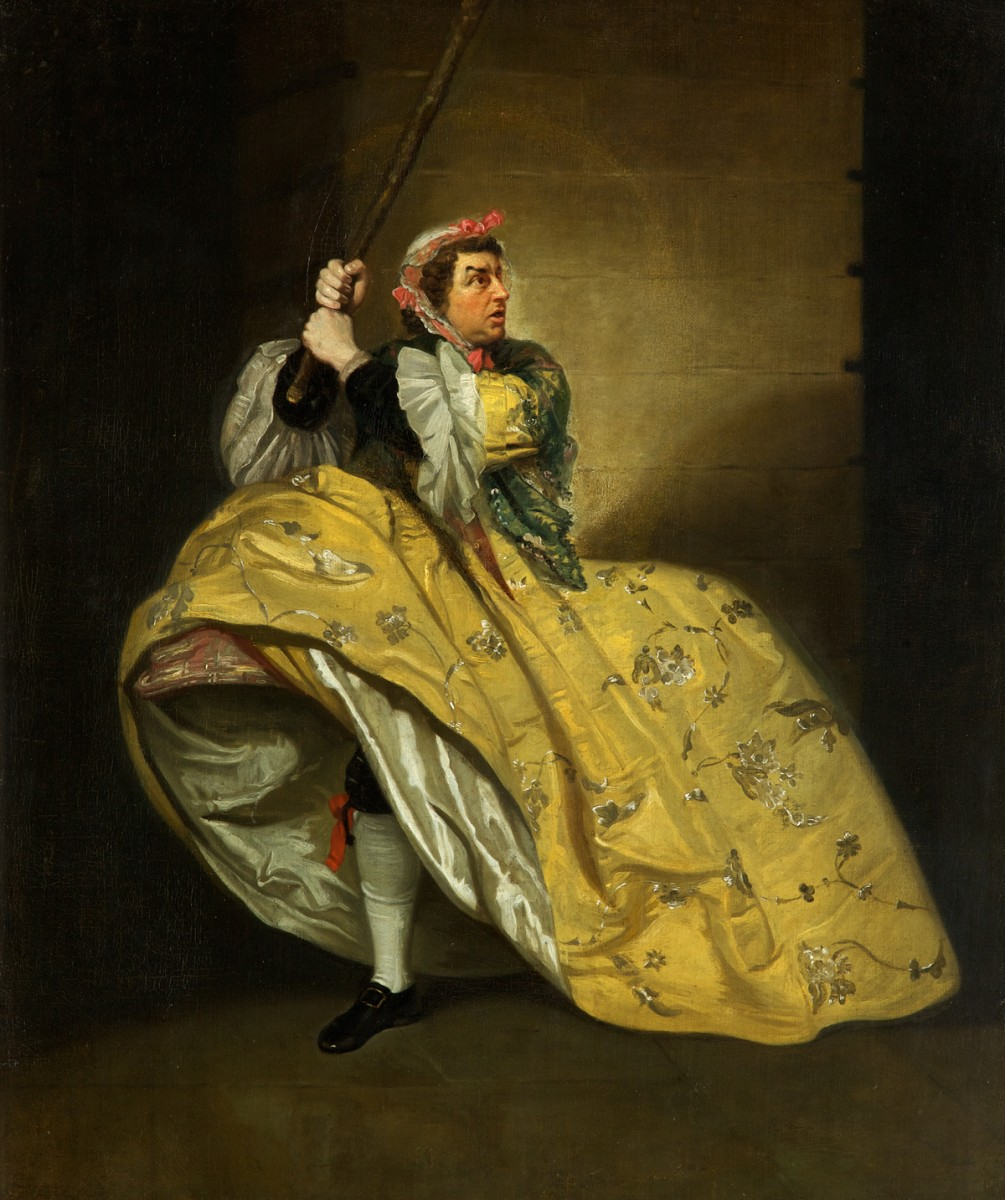
David Garrick in The Provoked Wife by Johann Zoffany, 1765. The role of Sir John Brute in The Provoked Wife became one of David Garrick's most famous roles.

The Provoked Wife is a comedy, but Elizabeth Barry, who played the abused wife, was especially famous as a tragic actress, and for her power of "moving the passions", i.e., moving an audience to pity and tears. Barry and the younger Bracegirdle had often worked together as a tragicomic heroine pair to bring audiences the typically tragicomic rollercoaster experience of Restoration plays. Vanbrugh takes advantage of this schema and these actresses to deepen audience sympathy for the unhappily married Lady Brute, even as she fires off her witty ripostes. In the intimate conversational dialogue between Lady Brute and her niece Belinda (Bracegirdle), and especially in the star part of Sir John Brute the brutish husband (Betterton), which was hailed as one of the peaks of Thomas Betterton's remarkable career, The Provoked Wife is something as unusual as a Restoration problem play.

== Adaptations ==
One of the first radio adaptations was broadcast on the BBC Third Programme on 15 June 1948. The production was adapted by Ronald Simpson, and the cast included Norman Shelley as Sir John Brute, Lydia Sherwood as Lady Brute and Ellen Pollock as Lady Fanciful.

In 1963, Prospect Productions (Oxford Playhouse) presented at Century Theatre, Binsey, as well as in Oxford. Toby Robertson, producer, June Brown, Trevor Martin (Sir John Brute), John Bonney, Tim Seely as gallants and A. Bell as Bellinda, Eileen Atkins as Lady Brute. Josephine Woodford as the maid, Robert Arnold her suitor and Edward Hardwicke as the J.P. Alan Barrett provided sets and it featured the "clever pastiche" of Madeleine Dring. It was repeated at Georgian Theatre, Richmond, Yorkshire. This show was brought to London to the Vaudeville.

Trevor Peacock played Sir John Brute, Prunella Scales Lady Brute and Zoe Wanamaker Belinda in a production at the Watford Palace Theatre 21 February – 10 March 1973.

In 1991, the play was presented in the short-lived open-air theatre at the Weald and Downland Museum near Chichester. It starred Sam Kelly as Sir John Brute and Philippa Urquhart as Lady Fanciful.

In December 2004, BBC Radio 3 broadcast an adaptation by Jim Poyser directed by Pauline Harris. The cast included Julian Rhind-Tutt as Heartfree, Tom Mannion as Constant, Dave Hill as Sir John Brute, Saskia Reeves as Lady Brute, Sarah Smart as Belinda, Josie Lawrence as Lady Fanciful, Tonia Chauvet as Claudette, David Crellin as Colonel Bully and Alexander Delamere as Lord Rake. The production was re-broadcast on 19 July 2015.. It was re-broadcast on 28 March 2026 on Radio 4 extra and was available on BBC Sounds for 1 month.

In March 2010, the Generation Theatre of San Francisco presented Provoquée, a play by Roland David Valayre (who also directed the production) based on The Provoked Wife and performed entirely in French, at the Off Market Theater. The cast included Cécile Lejeune, Françoise Lejeune, Benoît Levet, Michel Gasquy, Pierre-Yves Gouret, Marion Lovinger, Vincent Madiot, Thierry Rosset and Mireille Sagne. Generation Theatre later produced the actual Vanbrugh play 17 April – 4 May 2014.

In June 2014, Michael Cordner directed the play at the Department of Theatre, Film and Television, University of York.

In 2019, the play was performed as part of the summer season at the Royal Shakespeare Company, directed by Phillip Breen.

== See also ==
- Restoration comedy
- Restoration literature
