= Tribulation or the Misfortunes of a Cobbler =

- Directed by: Georges Méliès or Manuel
- Starring: Georges Méliès; Fernande Albany; Manuel
- Production company: Star Film Company
- Release date: 1908
- Country: France
- Language: Silent

Tribulation or the Misfortunes of a Cobbler is a 1908 French short silent film by Georges Méliès.

Méliès himself appears in the film as the Roman, alongside two of his frequent collaborators: Fernande Albany as the merchant, and Manuel as the farrier. A 1981 guide to Méliès's work speculated that Manuel may have also directed the film, noting that it matches his usual staging style. The film's special effects are created with stage machinery, pyrotechnics, substitution splices, multiple exposures, and dissolves.

The film was sold by Méliès's Star Film Company, but no French release, French-language title, or catalogue number has been located for it. The film has been known to scholarship since at least 1979, when John Frazer described it in a book on Méliès; however, Frazer misidentified it as a different Méliès film, The New Lord of the Village.
