= Soap Bubbles (film) =

1906 film by Georges Méliès

- Directed by: Georges Méliès
- Starring: Georges Méliès
- Production company: Star Film Company
- Release date: 1906
- Country: France
- Language: Silent

Soap Bubbles (French: Les Bulles de savon animées) is a 1906 French silent trick film by Georges Méliès.

== Plot ==
With smoke from a brazier, a magician makes a woman appear in midair and slowly float to the ground. Two assistants bring in an arrangement of pedestals, onto which they lead the woman. The magician blows soap bubbles through a straw, and they appear as women's faces, floating up to join the woman posing on the set of pedestals. Next they themselves change into real butterfly-winged women, before the whole tableau disappears.

Having his assistants bring on a wide plinth, the magician summons up the three women again, joining them on the plinth before they fade away. Finally, the magician curls up into a ball, becomes a giant soap bubble, and floats slowly upward. The magician returns to join his surprised assistants in a curtain call.

== Production ==
Méliès is the magician in the film, which combines stage machinery, pyrotechnics, substitution splices, multiple exposures, and dissolves to create its illusions. The opening title card is hand-lettered as in three other films by Méliès made around the same time: Rip's Dream (1905), The Tramp and the Mattress Makers (1906), and The Witch (1906).

Méliès's final trick, curling into a fetal position and disappearing into the womb of the bubble, is reminiscent of his later film The Knight of Black Art (1907), in which he disappears into a large hoop. In both cases, he returns at the end of the film to reassure his frightened assistants.

== Release and legacy ==
Soap Bubbles was sold by Méliès's Star Film Company and is numbered 846–848 in its catalogues. At his stage venue, the Théâtre Robert-Houdin, Méliès did a magic act between 1907 and 1910 developing the soap-bubble motif from the film. In the stage act, a ghost slept on a stool, with huge soap bubbles come out of his head as he snored. Three such bubbles floated around the stage, and three phosphorescent ghostly heads appeared inside them.
