= Robert Macaire and Bertrand =

- Directed by: Georges Méliès
- Production company: Star Film Company
- Release date: 1906
- Running time: 364 meters/1060 feet Approx. 18–20 minutes
- Country: France
- Language: Silent

Robert Macaire and Bertrand (French: Robert Macaire et Bertrand, les rois de cambrioleurs) is a 1906 French silent film directed by Georges Méliès.

== Plot ==
Some details from the following synopsis are taken from the plot description in Méliès's 1905 American catalogue.

Two thieves, Robert Macaire and his friend Bertrand, are eating a cheap meal at a small inn. Finding the inn's buffet table momentarily unattended, they steal everything on the table, including the tablecloth, and make a getaway. When the waitress returns, she realizes what the thieves have done and calls for help. Four police officers start off after Macaire and Bertrand. As the chase begins, the criminals break into the International Bank and steal some bags of gold. They escape through a transom and finally arrive in a theatre's costume storage room, where they disguise themselves as tourists. The thieves, hiding their everyday clothes, attempt to catch a train in their new disguises, and just manage to catch hold of the end of the last car. The pursuing policemen order a special train so they can continue tailing Macaire and Bertrand.

Just as the chase reaches an out-of-the-way village, an earthquake begins. Thieves and police alike are hurled into the air and fly through the clouds over France. Finally, Macaire and Bertrand manage to land by clinging to a chimney. The knockabout chase resumes in the house below, to the chagrin of its owners. At length, Macaire and Bertrand throw the police off the scent and hide in a nearby farm. Their cover is lifted when Bertrand, mistaking a policeman's hat and cloak for the policeman himself, makes a loud noise and attracts the attention of the police officers. In the ensuing fight, both Macaire and Bertrand fall to the ground dead. The police shed a collective tear for the tragic demise of their two enemies.

When the police leave, Macaire and Bertrand get up unharmed; they had faked their deaths. The chief police officer, returning to the scene to write a report of the event, is just in time to see them escape, and chases them to an open area where a gas balloon is about to be launched. Macaire and Bertrand jump into the balloon and escape upward. The chief officer is momentarily hooked on the balloon's anchor, but quickly falls to earth. The police officers make one final attempt to catch the balloon by climbing to the top of the July Column, but they are showered with sand from the balloon's ballast bags. Macaire and Bertrand, celebrating their freedom in the clouds, are triumphant.

== Production ==
On 23 December 1905, Les Quatre Cents Coups du diable, a spectacular féerie stage production by Victor de Cottens and Victor Darlay, premiered at the Théâtre du Châtelet. Méliès, who had previously worked with De Cottens on a 1904 Folies Bergère attraction later released as An Adventurous Automobile Trip, was commissioned for Les Quatre Cents Coups du diable to make two short films to be projected as part of the show: Le Voyage dans l'éspace (The Space Trip) and Le Cyclone (The Cyclone). The production, a popular success, ran for some five hundred performances. Méliès reused Le Voyage dans l'éspace by incorporating it into The Merry Frolics of Satan, a film freely adapted from the Châtelet production. In order to reuse Le Cyclone, Méliès designed a separate film, Robert Macaire and Bertrand.

Robert Macaire, a legendary bandit antihero in the Romantic tradition, first appeared on stage as a character in a Parisian melodrama, The Inn of Les Adrets (L'Auberge des Audrets). When the French actor Frédérick Lemaître played Macaire at the Théâtre de l'Ambigu-Comique in 1823, he introduced a distinctive visual appearance for the character and added a vein of black comedy to the role; Lemaître's characterization was a major success and became a cultural icon. By 1834, Lemaître had entirely rewritten the play, transforming it into a topically oriented comedy called simply Robert Macaire. Other nineteenth-century actors who played Lemaître's version of Macaire included James William Wallack, Charles Fechter, and Sir Henry Irving. By the end of the nineteenth century, Robert Macaire and his sidekick, a fellow confidence trickster named Bertrand, had become among the most immediately recognizable icons of French caricature. Méliès himself used them for caricature in 1889, when he criticized the Boulangist movement by depicting Georges Ernest Boulanger and Henri Rochefort as Robert Macaire and Bertrand, respectively.

Méliès's film was likely inspired particularly by a production of Robert Macaire staged at the Théâtre de l'Ambigu-Comique in 1903. The film, by shifting the title characters' profession from confidence tricksters to bank robbers, avoids the political undertones that would otherwise have been connected with the figures of Robert Macaire and Bertrand, turning their exploits into the impetus for a comic chase sequence. The sequence produced for Les Quatre Cents Coups du diable appears as Tableaux 20 and 23 in the film. The scenery for the film includes numerous glimpses of Méliès's Paris; during the cyclone, the Eiffel Tower, the Arc de Triomphe, Sacré-Cœur, the Place de la Concorde, and the Louvre are all visible. One sight gag in the film—the scene when Bertrand mistakes a hat and coat for a policeman—is an early cinematic example of a comic routine in which inanimate objects are confused with people; the gag became widely popular in silent comedy films.

== Release and reception ==
The film was released by Méliès's Star Film Company and is numbered 888–905 in its catalogues, where it was described as a folie burlesque fantastique en 35 tableaux. In France, the film was advertised as having 35 tableaux (scenes), while in America it was described with 25. However, the film itself ran the same way in both countries, with the differing tableau designations invented purely for advertisement purposes. A hand-colored print of the film was also available at a higher price. After Méliès's lifetime, the film was presumed lost until 1988, when a print was rediscovered and identified by Eileen Bowser, film curator at the Museum of Modern Art in New York.

A 2010 Slant Magazine review of a collection of Méliès films highlighted Robert Macaire and Bertrand for special praise, saying that during the criminals' flight through the sky, "Méliès manages to communicate something of the sublimity of motion, the expression of which forms one of the great pleasures of his later work and one which mirrors the director's own giddy sense of discovery in his own ability to manipulate space and time."

== See also ==
- Robert Macaire
