= An Adventurous Automobile Trip =

1905 film by Georges Méliès

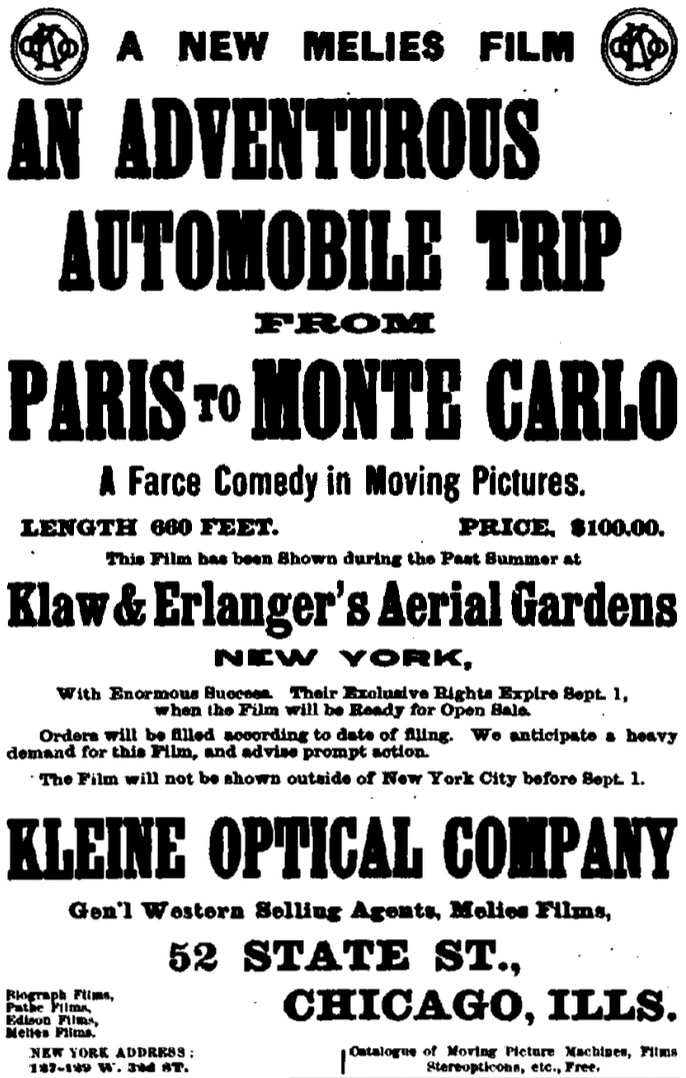
- American newspaper advertisement for the film
- Directed by: Georges Méliès
- Starring: Harry Fragson
- Production company: Star Film Company
- Release dates: 31 December 1904 (Folies Bergère version); 1905 (standalone release)
- Running time: 200 meters/660 feet 12–13 minutes
- Country: France
- Languages: French, Silent

An Adventurous Automobile Trip (French: Le Raid Paris–Monte Carlo en automobile or Le Raid Paris–Monte Carlo en deux heures) (Note: The film is called Le Raid Paris–Monte Carlo en automobile in Méliès's 1905 catalogue, and Le Raid Paris–Monte Carlo en deux heures in the 1906 edition.) is a 1904 French silent comic trick film directed by Georges Méliès. The film, a spoof of the devil-may-care motoring exploits of King Leopold II of Belgium, features the King engaging in a manic, implausibly fast automobile ride from Paris to Monte Carlo. The singer-comedian Harry Fragson stars as the King, supported by a large cast of stage performers from the Folies Bergère cabaret and other venues, with two cameo appearances from Méliès himself.

Méliès, working in collaboration with the stage director Victor de Cottens, designed An Adventurous Automobile Trip as an innovative Folies Bergère act combining stage performance and film, with a live prologue and epilogue used to frame the filmed sequence. After this version premiered on 31 December 1904, Méliès adapted the film to be a standalone release for general distribution in 1905. The lavish film, available in both black-and-white and hand-colored versions, was a popular and critical success both in France and in America. However, the film's high production values made it too expensive for many exhibitors, one of several factors that sent Méliès's career into decline.

== Plot ==
An Adventurous Automobile Trip (1905)

King Leopold, on holiday in Paris, wants to visit Monte Carlo, but does not have time for the seventeen-hour express train ride between the two cities. He happens upon an automobile maker who claims his car can make the distance in just two hours. The King agrees and sets off in the car, with the auto maker acting as chauffeur. A large crowd sees them off from outside the Paris Opera House, including many celebrities from the Paris theatre world. After stopping to fill the car with gas, the King starts it and, from inexperience, accidentally runs it backward over a policeman, who is squashed flat as a pancake. The King starts inflating him with a pump, and then, to save time, lets other onlookers finish the job while he drives off. The onlookers set to the work with gusto, so much so that the overinflated policeman ends up exploding.

The car speeds over the French countryside and into the Alps, leaping between mountains and knocking over a postman as it goes. At the gates of Dijon, town officials try to stop the car to enforce the octroi tax, but the car keeps its course and runs headlong into one of the officials, who explodes in his turn. The car wends its way across the Mediterranean coast, overturning a fruit stand, crashing through a greenhouse, colliding with a tar wagon (with another explosion ensuing), and, finally, arriving at the grandstand of spectators awaiting them at Monte Carlo. The car is now going at such speed that, rather than stopping in front of the grandstand, it somersaults up the stairs and crashes to earth. The King and chauffeur, unharmed by their adventurous race, are greeted warmly. (Note: Since the film is silent and has no intertitles, some details for this plot summary are based on the synopsis offered in Méliès's American catalogue.)

== Production ==
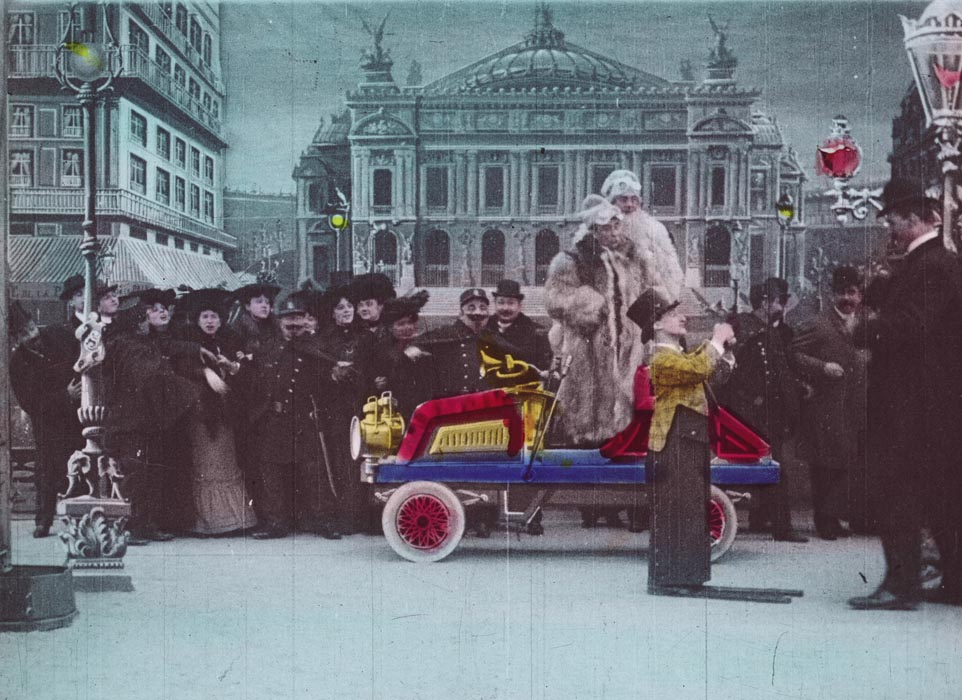
Frame from a hand-colored print of the film

For the 1904 Folies Bergère cabaret revue, the director Victor de Cottens approached Méliès—then at the height of his fame as a filmmaker—with the idea of combining theatre and cinema by presenting a short film as one of the fourteen segments of the stage production. The two directors worked out a scenario that would parody the motoring adventures of King Leopold II of Belgium, who was famous for driving, and often crashing, fast cars. In the stage-screen amalgamation devised by Méliès and de Cottens, the segment began as a sketch with live performers before continuing as a film; at the end of the film, the actor playing the King, as well as other actors playing cheering spectators, returned to the stage to finish the sketch live.

Méliès drew the cast of the film from various sources. Harry Fragson, a London-born singer and comedian who was one of the stars of the Folies Bergère at the time, played the lead role of King Leopold. Louis Maurel, a Paris singer and comedian who had worked with Fragson in the 1903 Folies Bergère revue, was the chauffeur. In the scene in front of the Paris Opera, the celebrities assembled include Jean Noté, a singer at the opera house; the short actor Little Pich, whose persona was a close imitation of the better-known British comedian Little Tich, and who also acted in films by Pathé Frères and Gaumont; the tall actor Antonich, known as the "Giant Swede"; Félix Galipaux, who had been a popular music hall monologuist in Paris since the 1880s and who acted in several Méliès films; Jane Yvon, a Folies Bergère entertainer; Séverin Cafferra, a popular mime; and de Cottens himself. Fernande Albany, who also appeared in Méliès's films The Impossible Voyage, Tunnelling the English Channel, and The Conquest of the Pole, played the plump lady in the Dijon scene, and the Folies Bergère entertainers Blondet and Raiter also made appearances. Méliès himself plays two roles in the film: a mailman who gets knocked over by the car, and the octroi official who explodes. Méliès also cast more extras in the film than was usual for him, sometimes staging them in layered arrangements for visual clarity, and sometimes letting them move at whim to create more disorganized, naturalistic groupings.

In addition to the parody of King Leopold II, Méliès's scenario for the film features another topical element: the scene with the tar wagon is based on the experiments of Ernest Guglielminetti, who spread tar over a small part of the gravel road to Monaco. This experiment, widely reported by the press, successfully eliminated the dust clouds kicked up by cars on gravel and sand roads.

The film's special effects were created using stage machinery, miniature models, pyrotechnics, and the editing technique known as the substitution splice. Long shots showing the car were filmed with a miniature car and a landscape rolling past it, creating a multiplane effect. Most scenes, including the detailed and faithful recreation of the Place de l'Opéra outside the Opera House, were painted studio sets, as was Méliès's custom. However, the last scene, showing the arrival at Monte Carlo, was filmed not in the studio but outdoors in Méliès's garden.

== Release and reception ==
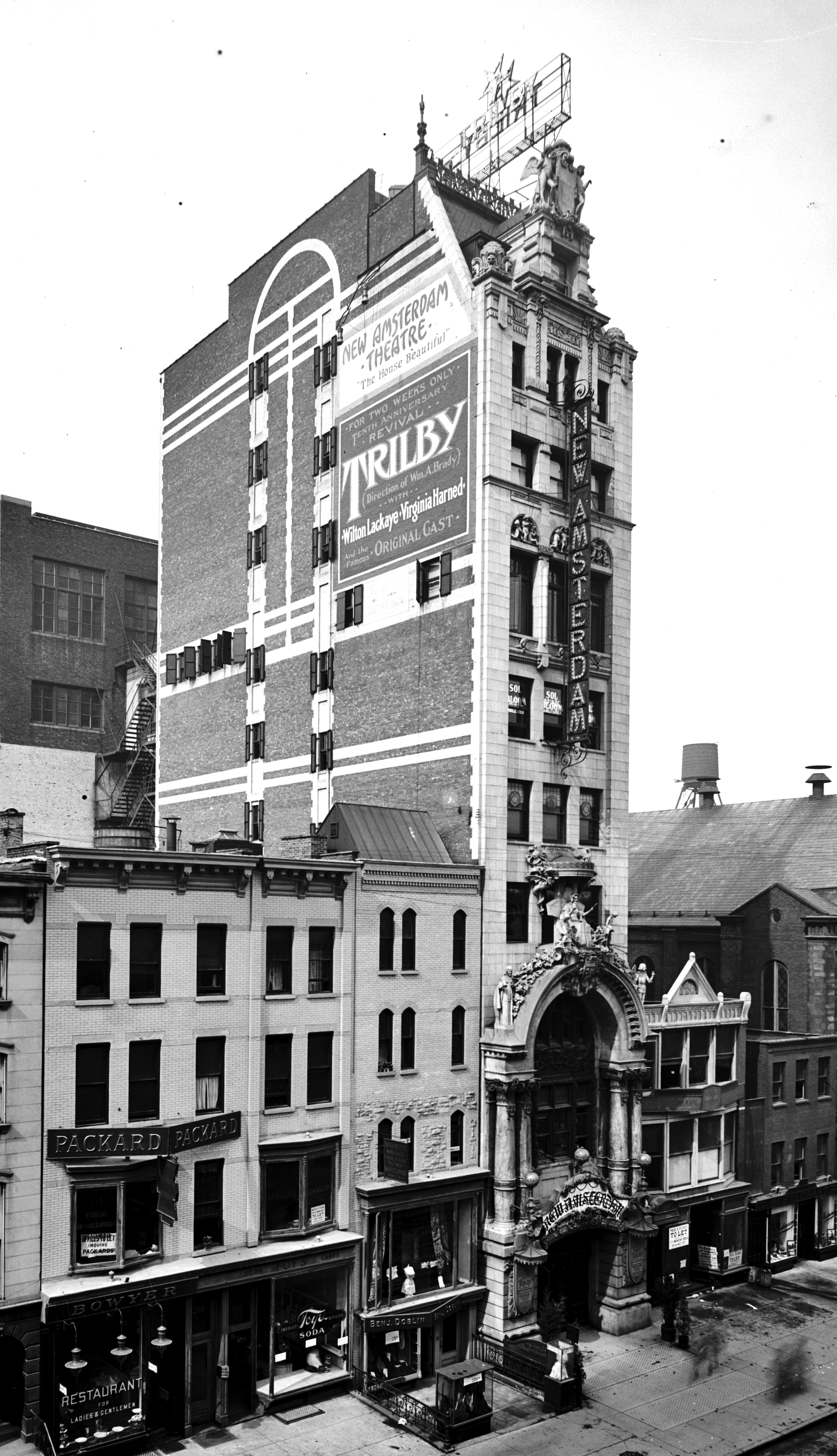
The New Amsterdam Theater in 1905, the year An Adventurous Automobile Trip was shown there

An Adventurous Automobile Trip premiered at the gala opening night of the Folies Bergère revue on 31 December 1904. It ran for six months at the Folies Bergère, lasting more than 300 performances. Méliès also intended for the film to be shown by exhibitors elsewhere, outside the context of the revue. Thus, after its Folies Bergère run, it was released as a standalone item by Méliès's Star Film Company and numbered 740–749 in its catalogues, where it is advertised as a grande course fantastique funambulesque. As with at least four percent of Méliès's output, the film was available both in black-and-white and in individually hand-colored prints sold at a higher price.

The film was also released in the United States, by the New York branch of Méliès's company. During the summer of 1905, Klaw & Erlanger showed it at the Aerial Gardens, on the rooftop of the New Amsterdam Theatre. In the American release, the scenes were slightly rearranged: the first and second scenes were switched in order, as were the sixth and seventh. In addition, because of a renumbering, ten tableaux were advertised instead of the French catalogue's twelve, although no scenes were removed. (The two prints of the film surviving in the Méliès family's archive, the Cinémathèque Méliès, use the French ordering of the scenes.) Another discrepancy between the French and American catalogues occurs for political reasons: the American catalog specifies that the protagonist is King Leopold, but the French one keeps the identity anonymous, so as not to offend Belgian audiences. Similarly, the Alps in the film are named as such in the American catalog but are unnamed in the French one.

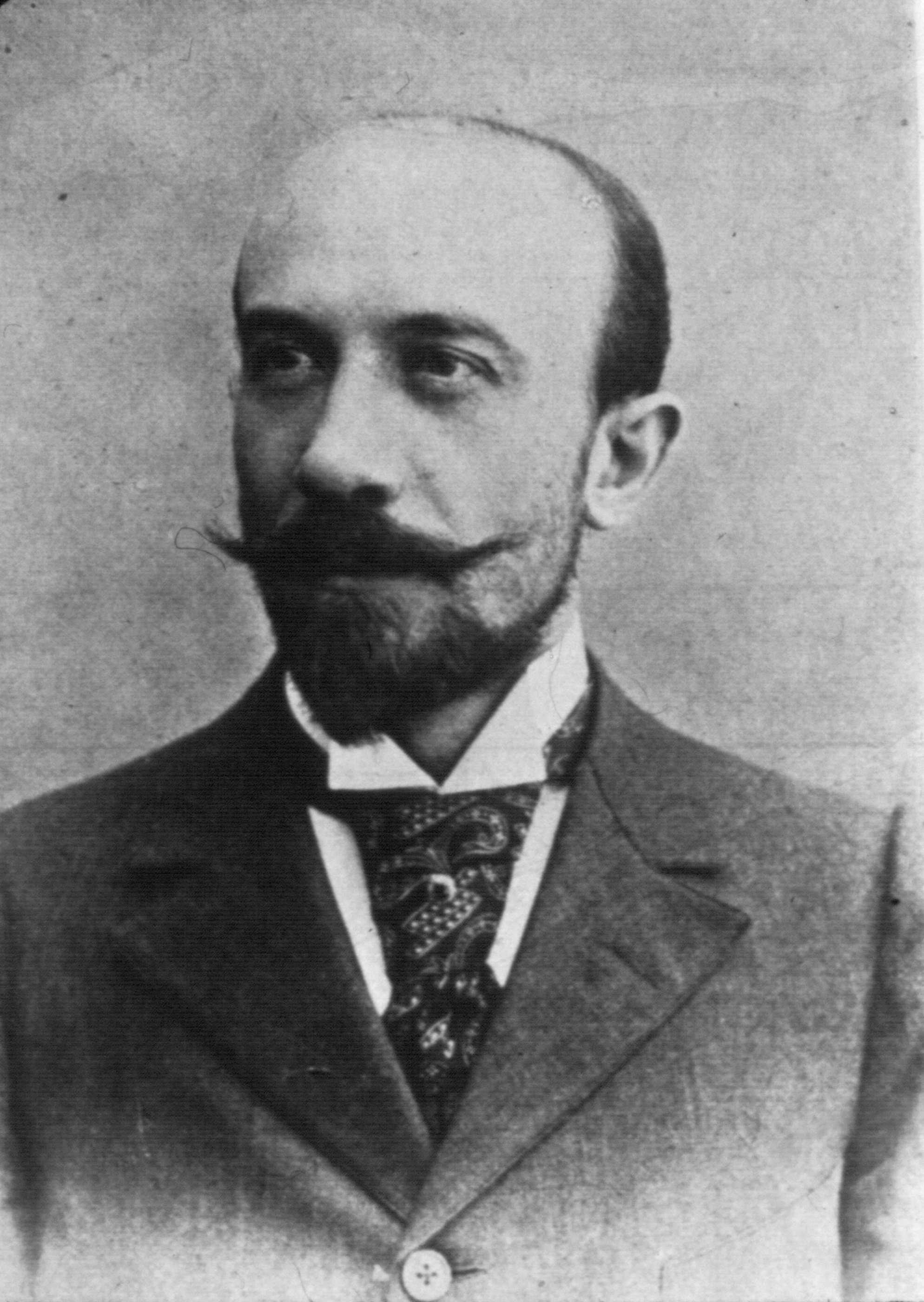
Georges Méliès

An Adventurous Automobile Trip was one of Méliès's most successful films, and ran to acclaim at the Folies Bergère for six months. A notice in The New York Clipper said that the film "is very clever, and keeps the audience in continuous good humor". The Morning Telegraph concurred, reporting that the film "scored an instant success. Nothing funnier has been seen here in many a day. ... The thing is a scream."

However, the venture was not as profitable as Méliès had expected; the high costs of the lavish hand-colored film put it out of the reach of many fairground exhibitors. These financial difficulties, which continued with Méliès's similarly spectacular film The Merry Frolics of Satan the following year, helped hasten the decline of Méliès's career.

Portions of at least three prints of the film survive: a complete nitrate print with the car sometimes painted red, given to Méliès's granddaughter Madeleine Malthête-Méliès by an American collector; an incomplete hand-colored nitrate print, bought by Malthête-Méliès from a Belgian collector; and some fragments at the Academy of Motion Picture Arts and Sciences. In his book-length study of Méliès, the film historian John Frazer spoke highly of the film, noting its careful use of continuity of direction and comparing it to Mack Sennett's slapstick comedies and to the 1968 automobile film Chitty Chitty Bang Bang. Méliès made another film in a similar vein, Le Raid New York–Paris en automobile, in 1908; it was also received with success.
