= Le Matelas Alcoolique =

Comedy short

Le Matelas Alcoolique is a 1906 short comedy film directed by Romeo Bosetti and Alice Guy-Blaché. The film stars Bosetti as the only named actor. The story follows a drunken man who is sewn into a mattress by a maid and then is delivered to a couple who have to deal with the pains of sleeping on their uncomfortable new mattress. This film is very similar to Georges Méliès’s film La Cardeuse de matelas. However, the main innovation of this film is that it is shot outdoors.

== Preservation ==
Le Matelas Alcoolique survives as part of the small amount of films directed by Alice Guy-Blaché that continue to circulate in the archives. The National Film and Television Archive in London holds this film under the name The Drunken Mattress. The George Eastman House holds a second copy with the name Le Matelas Alcoolique. It can also seen being referred to as The Epileptic Mattress or Le Matelas Epileptique.
