= The Tramp and the Mattress Makers =

- Directed by: Georges Méliès
- Starring: Manuel; Bruneval
- Production company: Star Film Company
- Release date: 1906
- Country: France
- Language: Silent

The Tramp and the Mattress Makers (French: La Cardeuse de matelas) is a 1906 French short silent comedy film by Georges Méliès. It was sold by Méliès's Star Film Company and is numbered 818–820 in its catalogues.

== Plot ==
In front of a shop, three mattress makers are busy sewing a mattress. When they go into a cheap wine bar for a break, a drunken tramp ambles onto the scene, and decides to take a nap inside the mattress. The workers come back and finish sewing up the mattress, not noticing the tramp sleeping inside it. Suddenly the tramp wakes up and tries to struggle out. Workers and passersby alike are startled to see what appears to be a living mattress tumbling and stumbling in the street.

The tramp, still completely inside the mattress, makes his way into the nearby wine bar. In the ensuing confusion, all the customers and bar staff run out, and a policeman rushes in to arrest the living mattress. When he stumbles into the policeman, the tramp finally manages to tear his way out of the mattress. Bar, mattress, and furniture alike all end up on top of the policeman. In a final medium shot, preceded by a trilingual intertitle ("À Votre Santé, Good Health, Prosit!!!"), the tramp pours himself a drink and toasts the audience.

== Production ==
The actors Manuel and Bruneval appear in the film as the tramp and the bald barman, respectively. The only special effect used is the substitution splice. The intertitle is lettered similarly to the title cards in two other films Méliès made that year, The Witch and Soap Bubbles. Méliès only rarely used titles within his films; in at least one example, the 1908 comedy French Cops Learning English, these took the form of placards held up within the film itself.

The concluding medium shot is likewise a rare occurrence in Méliès's films, which are typically made up of long shots. He later used similar concluding shots in The Witch the same year, and How Bridget's Lover Escaped the following year.
