= Buncoed Stage Johnnie =

- Surviving footage from Buncoed Stage Johnnie
- Directed by: Georges Méliès or Manuel
- Produced by: Georges Méliès
- Starring: Fernande Albany
- Production company: Star Film Company
- Release date: 1908
- Country: France
- Language: Silent

Buncoed Stage Johnnie (French: Pour l'étoile S.V.P.) was a 1908 French silent comedy film produced by Georges Méliès. It was directed either by Méliès or by his assistant, an actor known as Manuel.

== Plot ==
A stage actress's wealthy admirer, or "Stage Door Johnnie", brings a bouquet to the theatre and asks a stagehand to pass it along to the admired actress. The stagehand, for a practical joke, changes the card on the bouquet so that it appears to be meant for the theater's lady janitor. The janitor, accepting the flowers, sends the Stage Door Johnnie a note telling him to meet her at the stage door. The Stage Door Johnnie, shocked to see the janitor approaching, tries unsuccessfully to escape her embrace. He finally struggles away, as the theatre's stagehands laugh at the success of the joke.

== Production ==
Fernande Albany played the janitor in the film. The scene in front of the stage door was shot outdoors, on Méliès's property in Montreuil, Seine-Saint-Denis, in front of the remaining section of a house that had belonged to his father Louis Méliès. (Some of the house had been taken down during the construction of Méliès's second and larger film studio, Studio B.) Georges Méliès had previously used the same location for his 1907 film The Good Luck of a "Souse".

Based on an analysis of the surviving fragments of the film, a publication on Méliès's films by the Centre national du cinéma suggested that Buncoed Stage Johnnie may possibly have been directed not by Méliès himself but by his production assistant, the actor Manuel.

== Release and survival ==
The film was released by Méliès's Star Film Company and was numbered 1310–1313 in its catalogues. The surviving print of the film is incomplete, making it difficult to follow the narrative continuity. The rest of the film is presumed lost.
