= The Doctor and the Monkey =

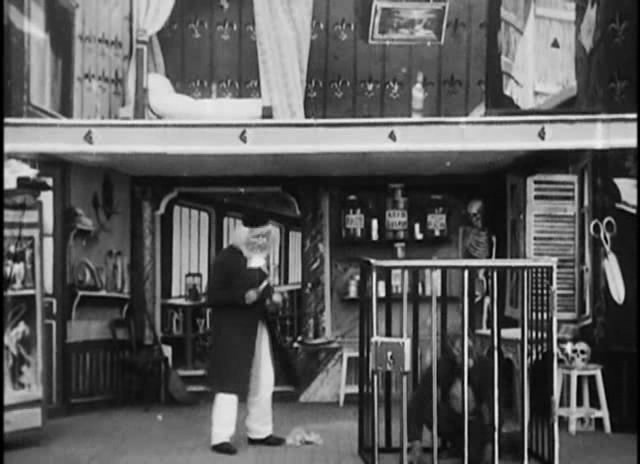
- A frame from the film
- Directed by: Georges Méliès
- Starring: Georges Méliès
- Production company: Star Film Company
- Release date: 1900
- Running time: 20 meters (approx. 1.5 minutes at 12 fps)
- Country: France
- Language: Silent

The Doctor and the Monkey (French: Le Savant et le Chimpanzé) is a 1900 French short silent comedy film directed by Georges Méliès.

== Plot ==
The Doctor and the Monkey (1900)

In a two-story home (the cross section design of the set allows the viewer to see both levels), a doctor is studying a caged monkey. When the doctor leaves for a moment, the monkey escapes from the cage and begins wreaking havoc on both floors. The monkey's tail detaches and takes on a life of its own, attaching itself to the doctor's nose. Both the doctor and a housekeeper run about attempting to restore order, but the monkey continues to overturn furniture, and tears off the housekeeper's skirt, leaving her in her pantalettes. As the short film ends, the whole house is in shambles.

== Production and release ==
Méliès himself plays the doctor. The double-decker set was reused later the same year in What Is Home Without the Boarder, in which Méliès plays one of the tenants.

The film was released by Méliès's Star Film Company and is numbered 317 in its catalogues, where it was advertised as a scène comique.

== Reception ==
In a comparative analysis of film history and video games, Manuel Garin Boronat notes that the film's imagery prefigures the multilevel action in Nintendo's game Donkey Kong (1981). Rae Beth Gordon, in a study of pathology in Méliès's work, comments that the film, with its antic monkey provoking equally antic behavior from a human, evokes themes of evolution and of humanity's "tendency to ape what we see" (tendance de singer ce qu'on voit). Gordon also notes that monkeys appear in several other films by Méliès, including The Merry Frolics of Satan; their roles in these films, as imitators and bringers of chaos, closely resemble the similar functions of imps and demons in many of Méliès's comedies.
