= The Merry Frolics of Satan =

Les Quat'Cents Farces du diable
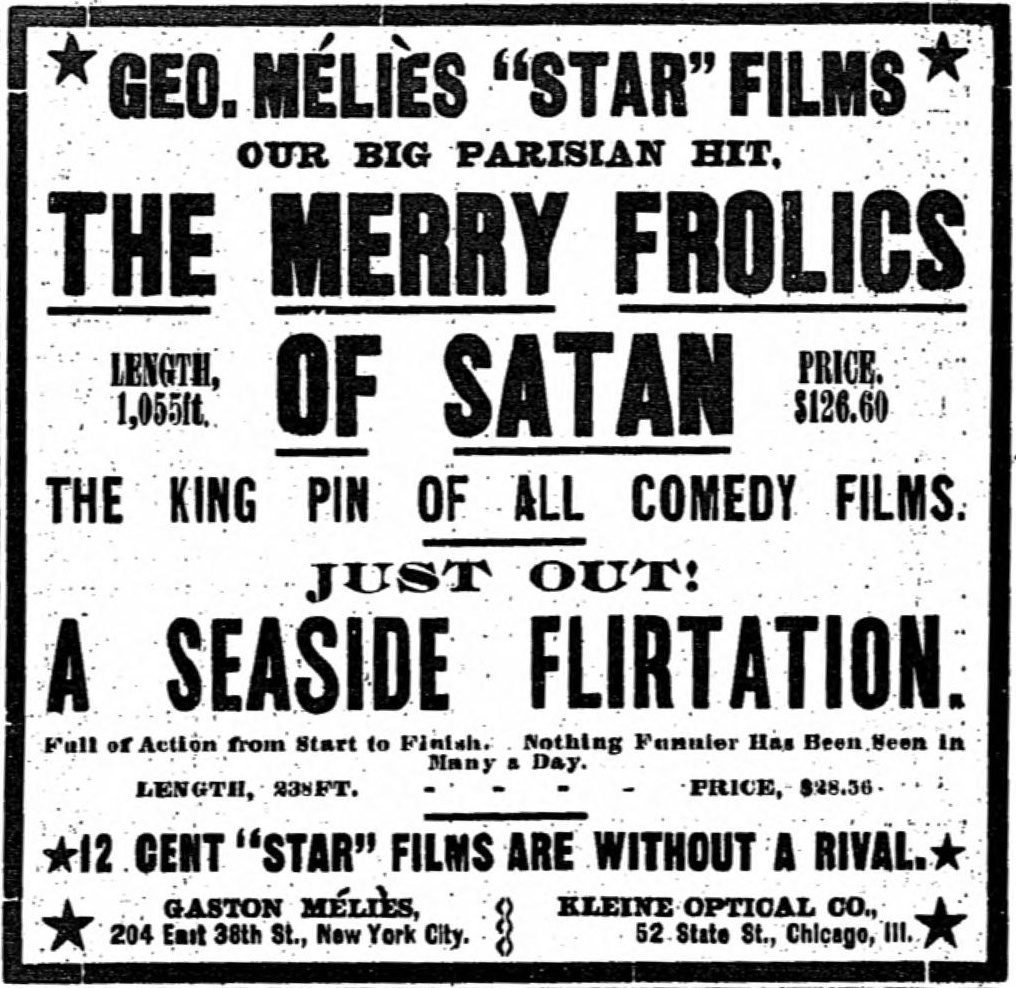
- Newspaper advertisement for The Merry Frolics of Satan and A Seaside Flirtation
- Directed by: Georges Méliès
- Written by: Georges Méliès
- Based on: Les Quatre Cents Coups du diable by Victor de Cottens and Victor Darlay
- Starring: Georges Méliès
- Release date: 1906
- Running time: 323 meters/1050 feet (17 minutes)
- Country: France
- Language: Silent

The Merry Frolics of Satan (French: Les Quat'Cents Farces du diable, literally The Four Hundred Tricks of the Devil) is a 1906 French silent trick film by Georges Méliès. The film is an updated comedic adaptation of the Faust legend, borrowing elements from two stage féerie spectaculars: Les Pilules du diable (1839), a classic stage fantasy with knockabout comedy, and Les Quatre Cents Coups du diable (1905), a satirical update of Les Pilules du diable to which Méliès had contributed two sequences, one of which he incorporated into the present film.

In addition to directing and acting in it, Méliès supervised all aspects of the film's design and trick effect work, including extensive use of stage machinery, in his lavishly individual style, which was already unusual in the mass production-dominated French film industry. The film follows the adventures of an ambitious engineer who abandons his family and responsibilities when he barters with the Devil (played by Méliès himself) for superhuman powers. The engineer is forced to face the unexpected consequences of his barter, including a dizzying ride through the sky.

== Summary ==
A partly hand-colored print of the film

An English engineer and inventor, William Crackford, is visited in his workshop by a messenger, who tells him that the famous alchemist Alcofrisbas is interested in selling him a powerful talisman. Arriving in Alcofrisbas's mysterious laboratory, where they are attacked and confused by magically moving and transforming pieces of furniture, Crackford and his servant John explain to the alchemist that they hope to make a high-speed trip around the world. Alcofrisbas promises to make the trip possible. With the help of his seven laboratory assistants, Alcofrisbas makes a batch of large magical pills for the engineer and demonstrates that, by hurling a pill upon the ground, Crackford can have any wish gratified. Crackford, in his excitement, does not read the terms of the contract he is asked to sign, and so remains blissfully unaware that he has just sold his soul to the Devil. When Crackford and John leave, "Alcofrisbas" resumes his true identity—Mephistopheles—and his "assistants" are revealed to be the Seven Deadly Sins.

Crackford comes home to dinner, where his wife and daughters are waiting for him. Wanting to try out the pills, he throws one to the floor. Immediately, two servants in livery burst out of a trunk, opening it to reveal more servants and a smaller trunk, who open it to reveal still more servants and another trunk, and so on; the process goes on until the dining room is full of servants, who load all of Crackford's furniture, as well as Crackford himself and his family, into the trunks. In the blink of an eye the trunks become a miniature train for the family, driven by John the servant. Crackford's high-speed tour has begun.

The tiny train wends its way out of the city, meeting with ridicule from onlookers. Arriving in the countryside, most of the train and all of Crackford's family are lost in an accident with a collapsing bridge; Crackford, caring only for his world tour, continues on undismayed. Crackford and John stop at a village inn, the landlord of which is again Mephistopheles in disguise. The two travelers find their attempts to eat confounded by magical disappearances and transformations; in despair, they go to the kitchen to eat with the servants, only to be disrupted by apes and demons in a farcical pandemonium of appearances and disappearances using every possible entrance and exit.

Fleeing out of the inn, the travelers make an escape in a horse and carriage, which Mephistopheles promptly transforms into a magical carriage made out of stars and comets and drawn by a bizarre mythological horse. Mephistopheles, following the travelers in an automobile, drives them up the slope of Mount Vesuvius and directly into an eruption. In a burst of lava and flames, the infernal carriage is shot into the sky and makes a voyage through space, flying past stars and planets. Colliding with a thunderstorm, the carriage bursts apart; Crackford and John tumble through space and crash through the ceiling of a dining room. Just as Crackford thinks he is about to get a bite to eat at last, Mephistopheles appears to fulfill the terms of the contract. Crackford is led into the Underworld, where gleeful demons turn him on a spit over the infernal flames.

== Background ==
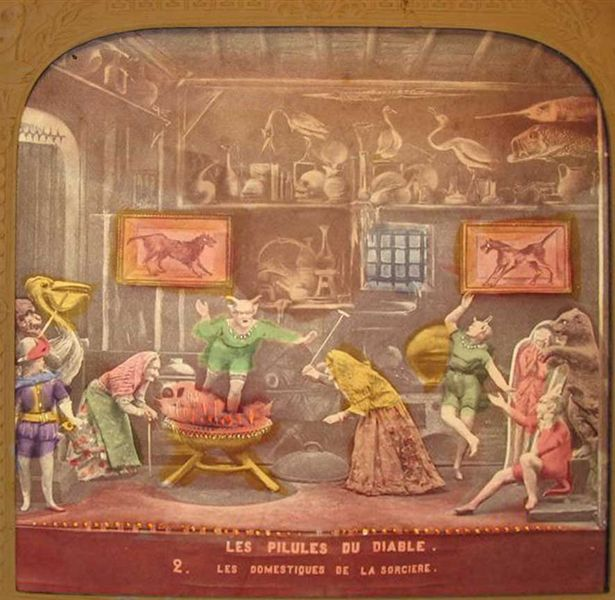
Stereoscope image of a scene from Les Pilules du diable

On 16 February 1839, Les Pilules du diable, a stage spectacular written by Ferdinand Laloue, Auguste Anicet-Bourgeois and Clement-Philippe Laurent, premiered at the Théâtre National de Cirque-Olympique in Paris. The play was frequently revived and became accepted as one of the classics of the féerie genre, a popular French genre known for its lavish production values and fantasy plots. The play follows a bizarre, extended, and supernatural chase in which two young lovers, Isabelle and Albert, must constantly flee from a rich hidalgo, Sottinez, who is vying for Isabelle's hand in marriage.

A new adaptation of the classic play, Les Quatre Cents Coups du diable by Victor de Cottens and Victor Darlay, premiered on 23 December 1905 at the Théâtre du Châtelet. This version of the play, though still in the féerie tradition of elaborately staged fantasy, introduced a modernized setting as well as an element of skeptical satire to the story. The De Cottens–Darlay version focused on a Good Genius who travels to Earth to fight the Devil; he soon becomes entangled in a search for three magic charms that the Devil intends to use as supernatural powers.

Méliès had previously worked with De Cottens on the 1904 Folies Bergère revue, for which Méliès produced a satirical film sequence about Leopold II of Belgium; the sequence was screened at three hundred performances of the revue, and was later released commercially by Méliès's studio as An Adventurous Automobile Trip. For Les Quatre Cents Coups du diable, De Cottens and Darlay commissioned Méliès to make two short films to be projected as part of the entertainment. One of these, for the scene titled "Le Voyage dans l'éspace" ("The Space Trip"), showed the Good Genie traveling from the sky to the Earth in a celestial taxicab (and, on a more practical level, filled the time needed for an elaborate scene change going on just behind the screen). The other filmed sequence was "Le Cyclone" ("The Cyclone"). Méliès also contributed material to the script of the production, which was a marked success, running for some five hundred performances. Contemporary critics singled out Méliès's filmed contributions, and their integration into the stage spectacular, for particular praise.

== Production ==
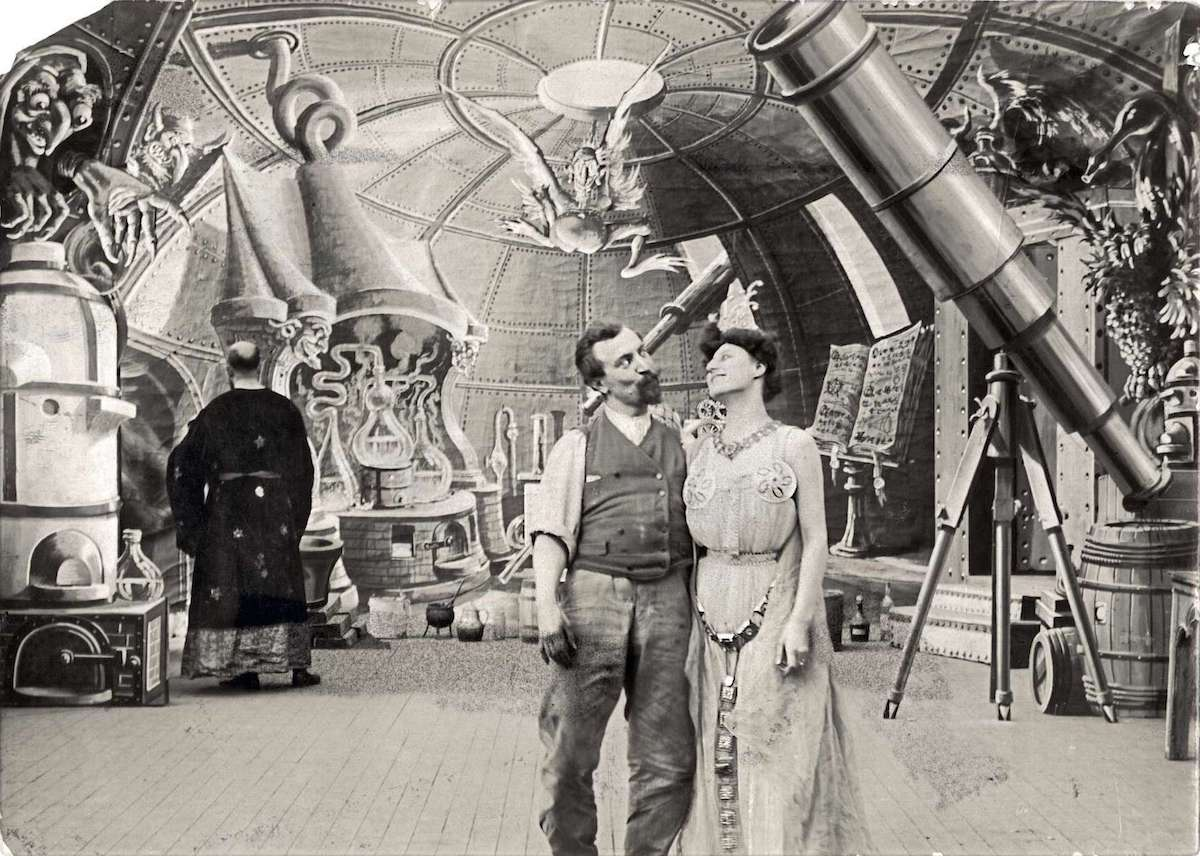
Behind the scenes of the film: Méliès, in costume, attends to the scenery while a crew member and actor make faces for the camera

After working on Les Quatre Cents Coups du diable, Méliès opted to build the filmed sequence "Le Voyage dans l'éspace" into a freestanding film. The new material was made at least six months after the original filmed sequences, with different actors, including Méliès himself as Mephistopheles. Though some elements of the film are derived from the stage play, Méliès devised a new plot, and modified the wording of the French title from Les Quatre Cents Coups du diable to Les Quat'Cents Farces du diable to avoid questions of copyright. (Méliès eventually reused the other filmed sequence from the play, "Le Cyclone", as a scene in his later film Robert Macaire and Bertrand.)

The Merry Frolics of Satan is strongly influenced by the legend of Faust, but maintains the modernized comic tone of the féeries. It involves numerous recurring themes in Méliès's work, such as a pact with the Devil, a celestial voyage, and a final triumphant scene in Hell; indeed, the end of the film strongly resembles Méliès's earlier The Damnation of Faust, complete with its detailed scenery and bat-winged demons. The farcically choreographed kitchen scene, the hectic pacing of which recalls Méliès's The Cook in Trouble (1904), faithfully reproduces the set and stage machinery that had been traditionally used for the equivalent scene in Les Pilules du diable ever since 1839.

The film was made primarily in Méliès's studio, with the outdoor scenes in the Italian village filmed just outside it, in the garden of the Méliès family property in Montreuil-sous-Bois. The many special effects in the film were created using substitution splices, multiple exposures, and especially a large amount of stage machinery, such as trapdoors, openings in the scenery, rolling backdrops, pyrotechnics, and a model volcano Méliès had previously used in his film The Eruption of Mount Pelee (1902).

== Release ==
The Merry Frolics of Satan was released by Méliès's Star Film Company and is numbered 849–870 in its catalogues, where it is advertised as a grande pièce fantastique en 35 tableaux. In an advertisement, Méliès emphasized the film's creative unity by pointing out that he was personally responsible for the scenario, effects, and production design, in marked contrast to the impersonal mass production process already in use at the rival studio Pathé. In his dedication to the individual process, Méliès would continue to stand in sharp contrast with the larger studios in the ensuing years.

Prints of the film survive, and a restoration by the film preservationist David Shepard, incorporating fragments colored by hand, was released to home video in 2008.
