= Tunnelling the English Channel =

Tunneling the English Channel
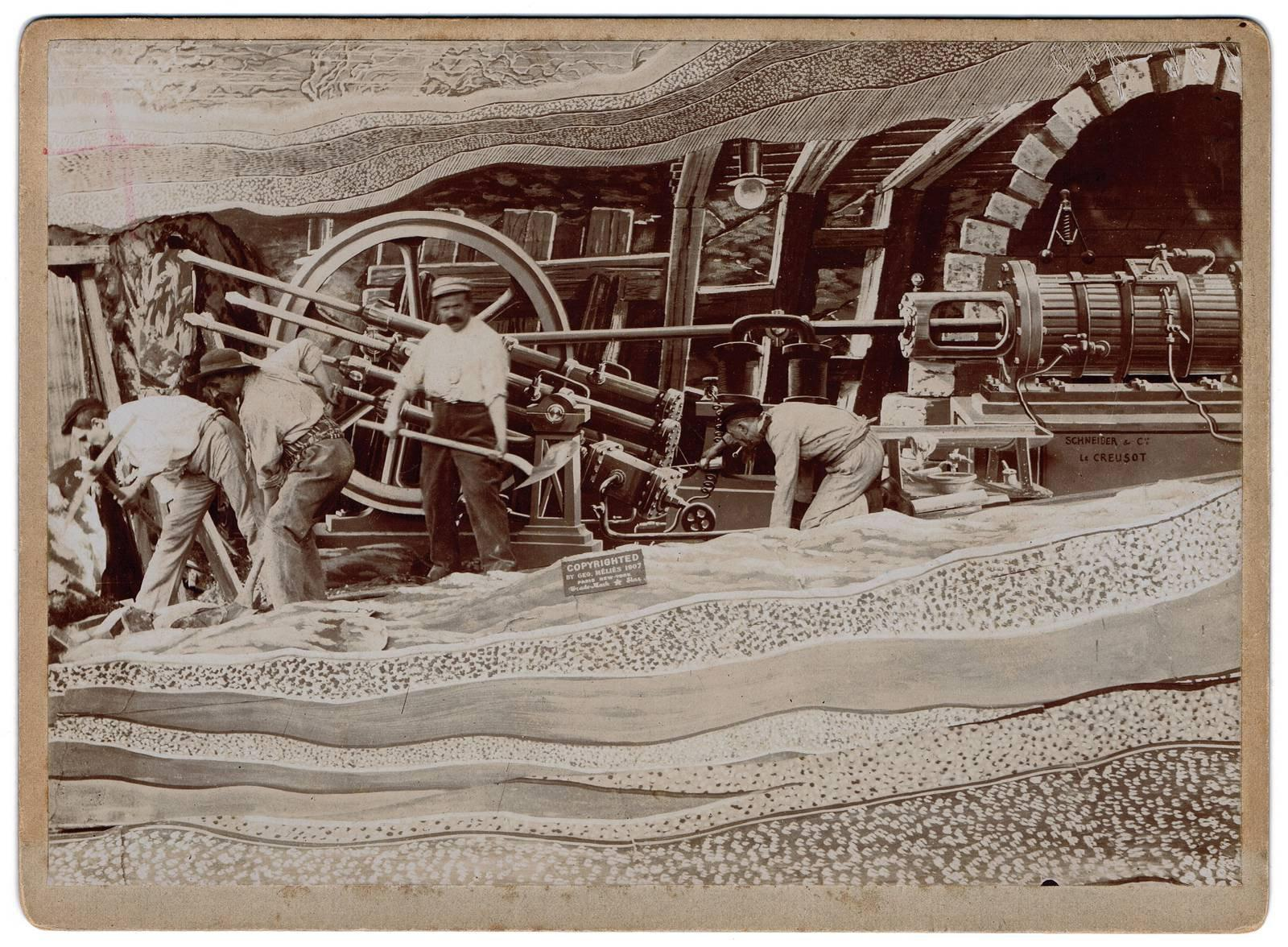
- Production still for the film
- Directed by: Georges Méliès
- Starring: Georges Méliès
- Production company: Star Film Company
- Release date: 1 July 1907
- Running time: 23 minutes
- Country: France
- Language: Silent film

Tunneling the English Channel (French: Le Tunnel sous la Manche ou le Cauchemar franco-anglais / Tunnel under the Channel, or the Franco-English Nightmare) is a 1907 silent trick film by pioneer filmmaker Georges Méliès. The plot follows King Edward VII and President Armand Fallières dreaming of building a tunnel under the English Channel.

== Production ==
Tunnelling the English Channel (1907)

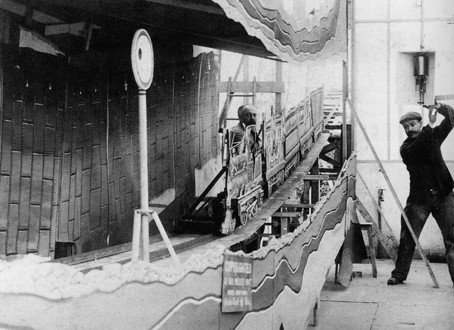
Operating scenery and miniatures for an underground scene

The idea of building a tunnel under the Channel was much discussed in 1907; Méliès's film is a highly topical take on the popular subject. Méliès appears in the film as the engineer who presents the blueprints for the tunnel. Fernande Albany, an actress who also appeared in Méliès's The Impossible Voyage, An Adventurous Automobile Trip, and The Conquest of the Pole, plays the leader of the Salvation Army parade. King Edward was played by a wash-house attendant who closely resembled the monarch, reprising a role he had played five years before in Méliès's film The Coronation of Edward VII. Special effects used in the film include stage machinery, pyrotechnics, substitution splices, superimpositions, and dissolves.

== Release and reception ==
Tunneling the English Channel was released by Méliès's Star Film Company and is numbered 936–950 in its catalogues, where it was advertised as a fantaisie burlesque à grand spectacle en 30 tableaux. For many of his longer films, Georges Méliès prepared a boniment, a spoken commentary explaining the action, to be read aloud while the film was shown; according to the recollections of Méliès's son André Méliès, the boniment for Tunneling the English Channel included dialogues between the French president and English king, with the latter speaking French in a thick English accent. The composer Bétove (real name Michel Maurice Lévy, 1883–1965) recorded a piano score for the film in 1946.

American film critic Jonathan Rosenbaum named it as one of his 100 favorite films. The academic Elizabeth Ezra called it "one of Méliès's wittiest and most engaging films."
