= Wave machine =

Wave machine may refer to:

- Wave power, a machine that uses the motion of ocean waves to generate electricity
- Wave pool, a machine that generates waves in a pool to simulate the ocean
- Shive wave machine, a wave generator that illustrates wave motion using steel rods and a thin wire
- Column wave, a theatrical device used to simulate the look of the ocean on stage
- Permanent wave machine, a machine that curls or straightens hair for a permanent wave hairstyle
