= The Witch (1906 film) =

- Directed by: Georges Méliès
- Starring: Georges Méliès
- Production company: Star Film Company
- Release date: 1906
- Running time: 820 feet (approx. 15 minutes)
- Country: France
- Language: Silent

The Witch (French: La Fée Carabosse ou le Poignard fatal, literally "The Fairy Carabosse or the Fatal Poignard") is a 1906 French short silent film by Georges Méliès. The film is named for a witch, Carabosse, who tells a poor troubadour that he is destined to rescue a damsel in distress, but demands a high price for a magic charm to help the troubadour in his quest. When the troubadour cheats the witch to obtain the magic charm, she sets out in pursuit of him, and puts various obstacles in his way before finally being vanquished by forces of good.

The film, said to have been inspired by Breton folklore, combines the traditional figure of Carabosse—first created in a 17th-century literary fairy tale by Madame d'Aulnoy—with a varied array of other magical and legendary elements, including ghosts, Druids, and monstrous beasts. It was commissioned by the Grands Magasins Dufayel department store, for children to watch while their parents shopped. Méliès made the film as a lavish, special-effects-heavy spectacle in the féerie tradition, possibly appearing in it himself. A print of the film survives; historians have commented on the film's spectacular qualities, its hodgepodge of fairy-tale attractions, and the ambiguous question of whether Carabosse's defeat is morally justified in the world of the film.

== Plot ==
A surviving print of the film

Note: Since the film is silent and has no intertitles, some names and details in the summary below are taken from the film's description in Méliès's American catalogue.

Lothaire, a penniless troubadour who is the last in a lineage of gallant knights, visits the witch Carabosse to find out what his future holds. The witch tells him that he will rescue and be loved by a damsel in distress, currently trapped in a dungeon as part of a plot by her father to steal her inheritance. Carabosse magically summons up a portrait of the damsel so that Lothaire will recognize her. Lothaire asks for a magic charm to help him rescue the damsel. The witch offers an enchanted four-leaf clover, but demands a steep price for it. Lothaire, having no money, tricks the witch by giving her a money bag loaded with sand, and hastily leaves to start his quest. Carabosse, discovering the way Lothaire has cheated her, is furious. She vows revenge and sets out in pursuit of the troubadour. As a weapon for herself, she enchants a poignard so that it can fly through the air and spit fire. The chase begins.

Lothaire tries to escape Carabosse by pushing down piles of rocks on her, but they are no match for the witch's magical powers, and she continues the chase flying on a broomstick. Crossing a field of sacred monoliths built by ancient Druids, Lothaire reaches a cemetery. He is surrounded by ghosts, but wards them off with the four-leaf clover. He reaches the imprisoned damsel's castle, and finds it guarded by monsters: a giant toad and owl, a fire-breathing dragon, and various serpents. Lothaire is about to be eaten when a Druid priest appears, on the ruin of an old altar nearby. He gives a piece of holy mistletoe to the troubadour, who uses it to tame the animals. Lothaire continues into the castle, where a ghostly knight presents him with an anointed sword used at the Crusades. Lothaire holds it in his teeth and climbs up the castle walls to the damsel's dungeon cell, while the Druid priest holds back the pursuing witch.

At long last he reaches the damsel, undoes her chains, and breaks open the cell door with a convenient battering ram. The troubadour and damsel escape just as Carabosse reaches the window, and enraged she flies away on her broom, creating a thunderstorm. She catches up to the escaping couple on the cliffs of a lake, and attacks them with her magic poignard. She is about to triumph when the Druid priest appears again, attacks Carabosse with her own broomstick, and sends her falling into the lake. One of her minions, a gnome, attempts to slay the Druid with an axe, but he turns the poignard on the gnome and vanquishes him. The couple, safe at last, receive a benediction from the Druid and vow eternal love.

== Production ==
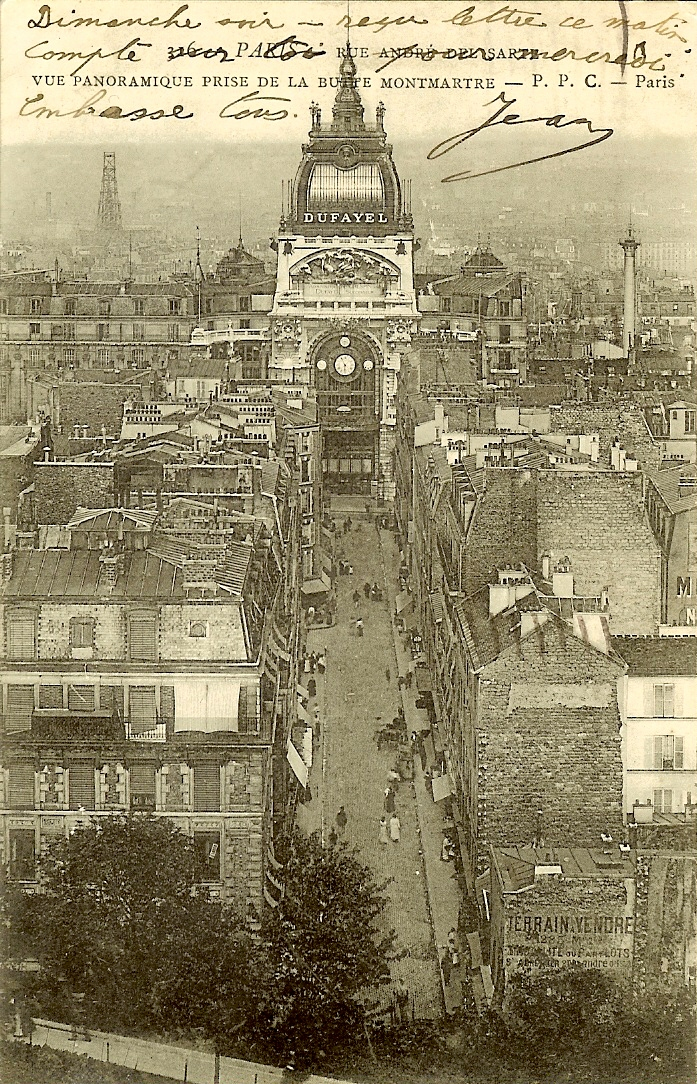
The Grands Magasins Dufayel store, circa 1904

The film was one of several commissioned from Méliès by the Grands Magasins Dufayel department store, which projected féerie films for children to watch in an adjoining room while their parents were shopping. The Dufayel showings were accompanied by various arrangements of sound effects, music, and spoken commentaries. They were so successful that, according to one recollection, children always complained when their parents came to collect them again.

According to advertisements, the film was inspired by Breton folklore; preproduction sketches indicate that Méliès initially planned to call it La Princesse Fatale. The witch Carabosse, for whom the film was finally named, had been a central figure in French fairy tales since her creation by Madame d'Aulnoy in the story "The Princess Mayblossom". Carabosse, acting as a wicked fairy godmother, famously appears in Tchaikovsky's ballet version of The Sleeping Beauty.

Special effects in the film were carried out using stage machinery, horizontally rolling scenery, pyrotechnics, substitution splices, multiple exposures, and dissolves. The title lettering style, seemingly inspired by Gothic art, was used the same year in Méliès's films The Tramp and the Mattress Makers and Soap Bubbles. The actors are uncredited, but film historian Georges Sadoul believed Méliès himself to be in the film as the witch Carabosse.

== Themes ==
Cultural historian Richard Abel finds The Witch consistent with Méliès's other spectacular féerie films, highlighting similarities to The Kingdom of the Fairies (1903). Abel puts the film squarely in the artistic tradition nicknamed the "cinema of attractions", noting the importance of hand-coloring to the film's appeal and commenting that the supposed narrative climax, the damsel's rescue, "seems perfunctory" compared to the fight with the monsters.

Cultural historian Jack Zipes similarly sees the film as "a hodge-podge of fairy-tale motifs held together by the typical narrative structure of the féerie". Zipes, praising Méliès's performance as Carabosse, notes that her downfall after being cheated is an inversion of standard fairy-tale logic, and is justified mainly by the inclusion of religious motifs that must defeat the "dark forces of evil" she represents. Zipes concludes that "the inconsistencies and the preposterous appearances of ghosts, a druid, a knight, and beasts, and reptiles are calculated to make spectators smile and ponder whether the absurdities on the screen can be so easily overcome as they seem to be."

== Release ==
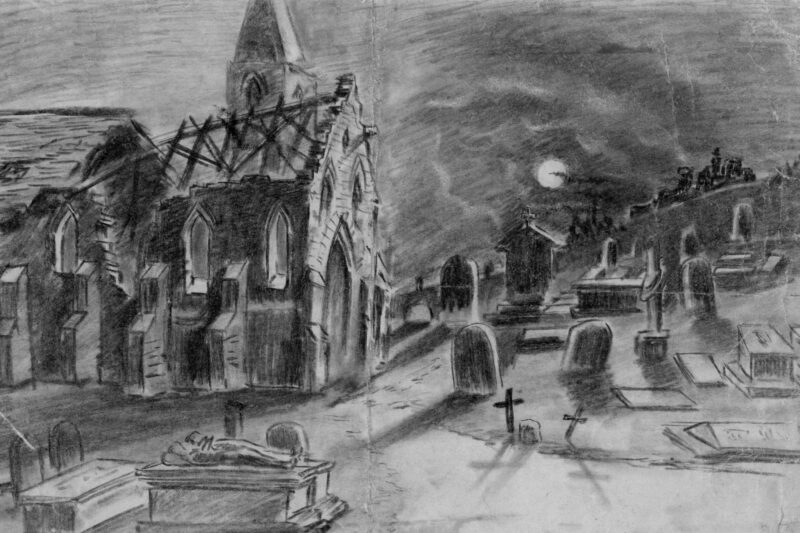
Méliès's design for the cemetery set

The Witch was sold by Méliès's Star Film Company and is numbered 877–887 in its catalogues, where it was advertised as a grande légende fantastique bretonne en 20 tableaux ("grand fantastical Breton legend in twenty tableaux"). The film was sold in a single reel of 820 feet, which at Méliès's preferred frame rate gives a running time of about fifteen minutes. The film was available both in black and white and in a hand-colored version sold for a higher price; a set of twelve publicity stills for the film were also available separately.

A hand-colored nitrate film print of The Witch survives at the Cinémathèque Française. A restoration by film preservationist David Shepard was released on home video in 2008, with a music score by Eric Beheim, as part of a Méliès collection. A new 8K digitization and 4K restoration was initiated by the Cinémathèque in 2020, and premiered at the film festival Il Cinema Ritrovato in August of that year.

== See also ==
- List of films about witchcraft
