= Nicola Sabbatini =

Italian architect

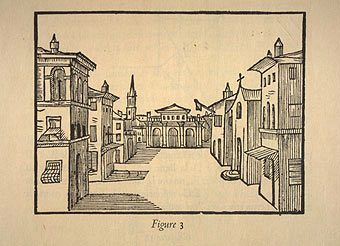
Perspective drawing of a complex stage set, from p. 23 of Sabbatini's book, 1638.

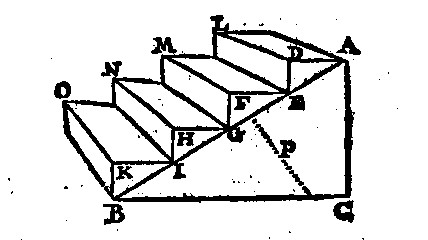
Woodcut showing how to construct a bank of theatrical seating, 1638.

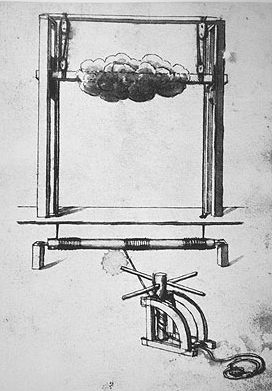
Sabbatini's design for a stage machine imitating moving clouds in the set, 1638.

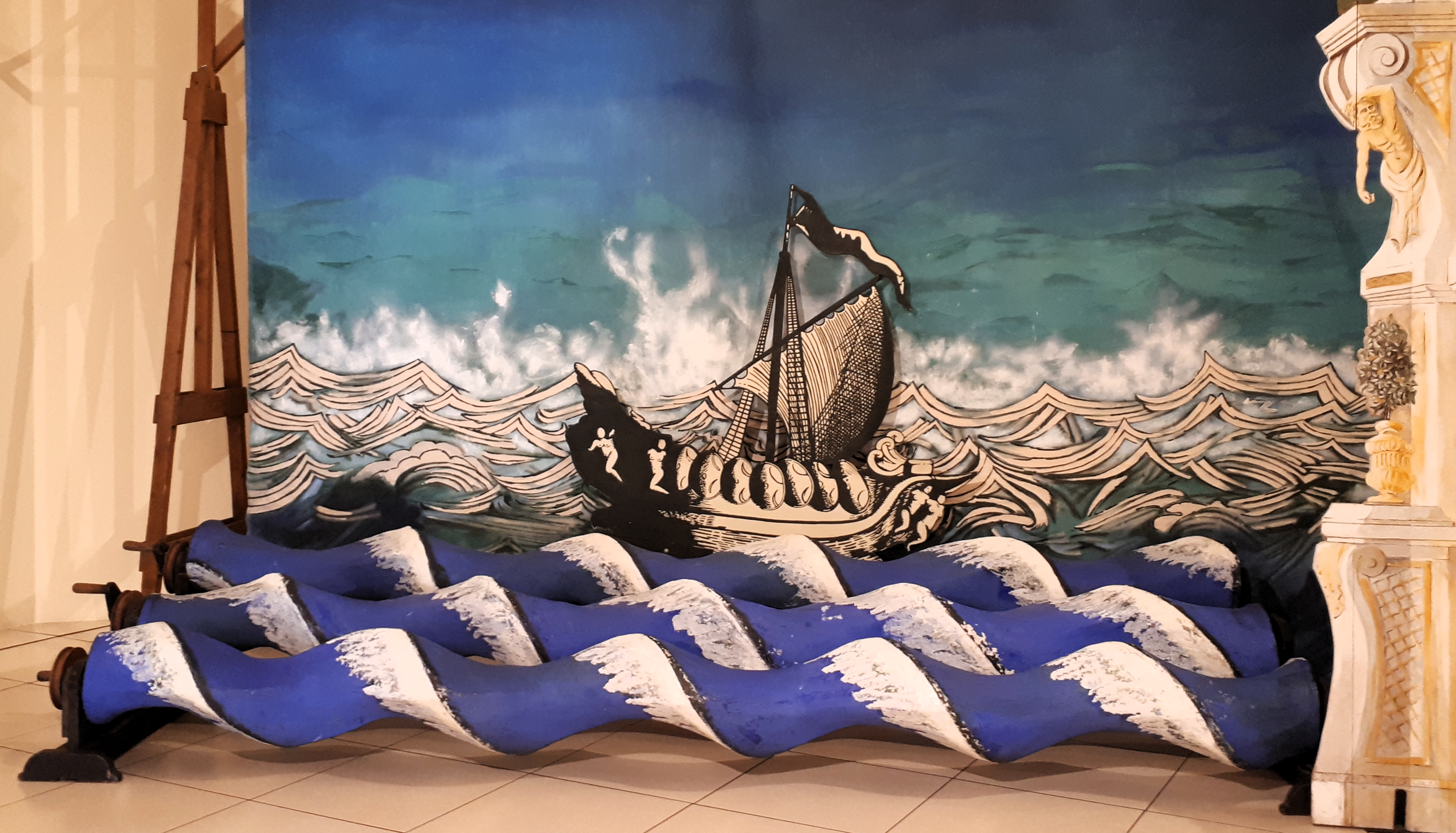
Sea of waves by Nicola Sabbatini

Nicola Sabbatini (1574 – 25 December 1654), also known as Niccolò Sabbatini or Nicola Sabbattini, was an Italian architect of the Baroque.

A native of Pesaro, he was extremely influential at the time for his pioneering and inventive designs of theaters, stage sets, lighting and stage machinery. Working in the court of the Dukes of Urbino, he was among the first designers of sophisticated machines which created realistic visual and sound effects such as the sea (the column wave machine), storms, thunder, lightnings, fire, hell, flying gods and clouds, etc. He wrote one of the most important books on how to construct and use a number of devices, scenes and machinery for the stage, Pratica di fabricar scene e macchine ne‘ teatri, which was published in 1638 . The internal architecture of theaters, such as plans for building seats for the audience, was also advanced by Sabbatini.

Sabbatini developed and described a number of novel stage lighting techniques, such as dimming mechanism to darken the whole stage, directed spotlights for illuminating certain parts of the stage (it is believed that he invented the first reflector spotlight, by attaching a polished basin behind a light source) and several others, thus effectively being, together with Sebastiano Serlio and Leone de Somi, one of the creators of stage lighting for dramatic purposes, including scripting lighting changes in synchronization with the play or opera. He developed a number of acoustic effects machinery, such as a "thunder box", a contraption which had heavy (15 kg) iron or stone balls which rolled down a case of wooden stairs when the effect was called for.

Sabbatini learned about theories on perspective by the mathematician and philosopher Guidobaldo del Monte, which had been published in his Perspectivae Libri VI at Pesaro in 1600. Asked to design the sets and stage machines in 1637 for a play in the Teatro del Sole in Pesaro, he used this knowledge to achieve perspective effects.

Among his many inventions devised for the design of more realistic decorations in the stage, he developed ways of quickly changing painted scenes, using several methods:

- Angle wings: flat panels at the sides of the stage, which were turned like pages in a book;
- Periaktoi: painted panels on the faces of standing triangles, which were turned around;
- Sliding shutters, which were moved on grooves in the floor;
- Roller curtains: the scene unrolled from above, over a previous one;
- Portcullis: sliding flat scene that rose rapidly from underneath the stage using counterweights.

These innovations created surprising and marvelous illusionistic effects, which came to be known as scènes à l'italienne.

In his researches on perspective for the sets, he defined the so-called œil du prince ("the eye of the prince"), as the ideal seat in the theatre's audience that affords the best possible perspective on the sets . In a chapter in his book, he describes ‘How to Place the Prince's Seat’, where ‘all the objects in the scene appear better... than from any other place’. It is located approximately in the middle of the seventh row and it is a coveted place.

Besides his important work in theatrical stage engineering, Sabbatini participated also as an architect and decorator in several of Pesaro's buildings, such as in the Palazzo Ducale, built by Duke Francesco Maria II della Rovere. Inside this building, he projected and built the Vecchio Teatro di Corte (old court theatre), which was later demolished. Later, he was commissioned by a group of Pesaro citizens to build the new Teatro del Sole (Sun Theater), which was inaugurated in 1637. Sabbatini was involved in the project of the new sea port of Pesaro and contributed to some works of art, such as in the design of three articulated panels painted by Giovanni Giacomo Pandolfi in the Nome di Dio oratory, also in Pesaro.
