= What Is Home Without the Boarder =

1901 film by Georges Méliès

- Directed by: Georges Méliès
- Starring: Georges Méliès
- Production company: Star Film Company
- Release date: 1900
- Country: France
- Language: Silent

What Is Home Without the Boarder (French: La Maison tranquille, literally "The Tranquil House") is a 1900 French silent trick film by Georges Méliès.

== Plot ==
What Is Home Without the Boarder (1900)

On the lower level of a house, a husband and wife are trying to eat a meal, but are constantly disturbed by the noisy carousing of three boarders on the floor above. The boarders end up breaking the ceiling plaster, making a hole through which they steal a bottle of wine. One boarder goes through the hole to the lower floor, and grabbing a sheet and some tubing, disguises himself as an elephant-like monster, to the astonishment of the wife. An officer marches in to deal with the unruly boarders, but is vanquished with a pile of bedding. The boarders dance around in triumph and build a barricade against the door of the house.

== Production and release ==
Méliès acts in the film as one of the three boarders. The film's two-level set was reused from The Doctor and the Monkey, which Méliès had made earlier in the same year.

The film was sold by Méliès's Star Film Company and is numbered 325–326 in its catalogues, where it was advertised as a scène comique (comic scene).
