= The Woes of Roller Skaters =

- Directed by: Georges Méliès
- Production company: Star Film Company
- Release date: July 1908 (USA)
- Country: France
- Language: Silent

The Woes of Roller Skaters, also known as The Woes of Roller Skates, is a 1908 French short silent comedy film directed by Georges Méliès.

== Production ==
The Woes of Roller Skaters was apparently inspired by a 1905 or 1906 film by Pathé Frères, featuring a character very similar to the exaggeratedly obese man in this film. Méliès appears in the film as the passerby attacked by "Apaches" at the end. The actor Bruneval plays the commissioner of police, with Méliès's set painter Claudel as one of the police officers. Fernande Albany plays one of the ladies.

== Themes ==
The film is one of several Méliès works in which spectators watching movement begin unintentionally to imitate it: in this case, a cancan and then a roller skating act. Like Méliès's 1905 comedy The Scheming Gambler's Paradise, the film parodies the police by showing them making their own comical use of confiscated objects.

== Release ==
The film was released by Méliès's Star Film Company, and is numbered 1227–1232 in its American catalogues. (There was no known French release of the film.) It was registered for American copyright at the Library of Congress on 21 July 1908.
