= The Knight of Black Art =

- Directed by: Georges Méliès
- Starring: Georges Méliès; Manuel; Suzanne Faes
- Production company: Star Film Company
- Release date: 1907
- Country: France
- Language: Silent

The Knight of Black Art (French: Le Tambourin fantastique) is a 1907 French silent trick film by Georges Méliès. It was sold by Méliès's Star Film Company and is numbered 1030–1034 in its catalogues.

== Plot ==
A magician, aided by his assistant and two women dressed as pages, constructs a large tambourine from two hoops and a piece of cloth. The magician paints a face on the head of the tambourine, and magically extracts wine bottles and clothing, including old-fashioned dresses, from the face. Multiplying the pages into four, the magician throws the dresses upon them, and they perform a brief dance.

Next the magician takes the frame of the tambourine (now without its head), and, suspending it from wires, makes one of the women rise up from it. He then disappears into the frame himself, to the astonishment of his servant, before returning for a final trick: separating the frame back into two hoops, he turns them into the wheels of a bicycle, and rides cheerfully away.

== Production ==
The cast includes Méliès as the magician, an actor called Manuel as his servant, and Suzanne Faes as one of the four women. Manuel was a frequent collaborator with Méliès, and since 1906 he had been supervising some of the films made in Studio B, the larger of Méliès's two studios. The film's special effects are created using stage machinery (including hidden structures, painted black, for concealing actors and props), substitution splices, and multiple exposures.

A guide to Méliès's work, published by the Centre national de la cinématographie, notes that it is amusing to see Manuel, so often Méliès's deputy director, here playing "the role of servant who mimics all his master's gestures."
