= Sightseeing Through Whisky =

1907 film by Georges Méliès

- Directed by: Georges Méliès or Manuel
- Starring: Manuel; Fernande Albany
- Production company: Star Film Company
- Release date: 1907
- Country: France
- Language: Silent

Sightseeing Through Whisky (French: Pauvre John ou les Aventures d'un buveur de whisky) is a 1907 French silent trick film credited to Georges Méliès. It was sold by Méliès's Star Film Company and is numbered 1000–1004 in its catalogues.

== Plot ==
A large group of tourists, complete with guidebooks, pith helmets, and a tour guide, arrive at a rocky landscape dominated by a ruined temple. One of the tourists, tired from the sightseeing, lies down on a rock and goes to sleep. A drunken footman, carrying the sightseers' luggage, lags behind the group. As they move on, he sits down and starts drinking extensively from a bottle found among the luggage.

As the footman collapses in a drunken stupor, a figure in Ancient Grecian or Roman robes appears and demands the frightened footman's attention. The robed figure summons up various visions: women in classical drapery, posing in tableaux; an ancient festival with dancing Bacchantes; Dionysus himself, riding a donkey; a fountain of fire; and a final tableau of women, one of whom lies down near the footman.

The footman is showering her with kisses when his hallucination comes to a sudden end, and he realizes he is embracing the tired tourist. Incensed, she fights him off, and a group of the other tourists drag the drunken footman away.

== Production ==
The film features two frequent collaborators of Méliès's: Fernande Albany as the tired tourist, and Manuel as the footman, who is identified in the film's French title as John. The special effects are created with substitution splices and pyrotechnics; the editing is not up to Méliès's usual standard, with the various transformations managed less fluidly than is typical for his films. A guide to Méliès's work, published by the Centre national de la cinématographie, concluded that the film was probably supervised not by Méliès but by the actor Manuel.
