= Œil du prince =

Concept in stage design

A theater at the Palace of Versailles, France, in the 17th century, showing the use of perspective in stage design. The "oeil du prince" seat is shown approximately at the middle of the audience

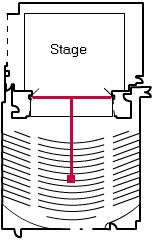
How the exact spot of "l'oeil du prince" is calculated. The vertical stem of the "T" is equal to the width of the stage

Theater room of the Palais-Royal, showing Louis XIII, Anne of Austria, and Cardinal Richelieu positioned at "l'œil du prince"

L'œil du prince (French: [l‿œj dy pʁɛ̃s]; English: "the prince's eye") is a French expression popularized by Nicola Sabbatini (1574–1654), an Italian stage designer and architect of the Renaissance in his famous treatise published in 1638. It is an imaginary point in the audience of a theatre, located in its central axis, approximately 0.6 m (18 inches) above the stage, and at a distance equal to the stage's width. In most theaters it corresponds more or less to the seventh row of seats. Sabbatini, in a chapter in his book, describes ‘How to Place the Prince’s Seat’, where "all the objects in the scene appear better... than from any other place". It is considered the best place and the most coveted one in the audience, which was reserved for the nobility (thus the reference to the prince). Due to the importance of these spectators, of course, many theater shows had their main movements and happenings designed in order to attract the attention of the prince's eye.

The usefulness of this point is that it permits the stage designer to calculate the perspective angles of the scenes (decoration) on the stage, as viewed from a central place (the focal point). Beginning in the 17th century, Italian theatrical decoration became very influential in the use of constructions in perspective, which added greater realism to depth perception by the audience. Thus, it satisfied the baroque ideal of opening towards the infinity. Sabbatini and others also invented the scene wings which run on grooves in the floor, allowing a quicker change of decorations during the intermissions. These innovations produced what became known as the scènes à l’italienne in theatres in Italy, France and elsewhere in Europe.

In a metaphorical sense, the French language also uses the expression to typify any privileged view of an observer (such as in "he had the eye of the prince when he was covering Iraq's war"), or also in a way of acting so as to please the privileged observer (such as in "he tried to conquer the eye of the prince in his report").
