= In the Barber Shop =

1908 film by Georges Méliès

- Directed by: Georges Méliès
- Starring: Fernande Albany; Manuel
- Production company: Star Film Company
- Release date: 1908
- Country: France
- Language: Silent

In the Barber Shop (French: Salon de coiffure) is a 1908 French silent trick film by Georges Méliès. It was sold by Méliès's Star Film Company and is numbered 1102–1103 in its catalogues.

Two of Méliès's frequent collaborators appear in the film: Fernande Albany as the plump client, and Manuel as one of the barbers. The film's special effects are created with substitution splices. The film appears to have been inspired by a 1906 Pathé film in which a Black man uses bootblack to darken the face of a woman who mocks him. The Black character in Méliès's film is played as a pejorative caricature, typifying the stereotypical figure of the dandy nègre ("Black dandy") that frequently appeared in turn-of-the-century French imagery. There may also be some influence from American minstrel shows.

In a study of otherness in popular entertainment, French writer Enrique Seknadje comments that the film perpetuates racist stereotyping by associating erotic desire with Blackness, but also that the woman's anger seems to imply a criticism of society's casual racism.
