= The New Lord of the Village =

1907 film by Georges Méliès

- Directed by: Manuel
- Produced by: Georges Méliès
- Starring: Fernande Albany; Mlle Bodson
- Production company: Star Film Company
- Release date: 1908
- Country: France
- Language: Silent

Le Nouveau Seigneur du village, also known as On ne badine pas avec l'amour, and known in English as No Trifling With Love and as The New Lord of the Village, is a 1908 French silent trick film released by Georges Méliès, and supervised by an actor-director employee of Méliès's, known as Manuel.

== Production ==
The film is one of many made in 1908 for Méliès by the actor Manuel. Méliès hardly ever appeared in Manuel's films, which were mainly made in the larger of Méliès's two studios, Studio B.

The cast includes Fernande Albany as the mother, and a Mademoiselle Bodson as the bride. The unidentified actor who plays the Marquis would go on to play Baron Munchausen in Méliès's 1911 film Baron Munchausen's Dream, while the actor playing the bailiff had already played a similar role in Méliès's 1905 film Rip's Dream.

== Release ==
Le Nouveau Seigneur du village was sold by Méliès's Star Film Company and is numbered 1132–1145 in its catalogues, where it was advertised as a scène comique à spectacle ("spectacular comic scene"). In the United States, it was sold under the title No Trifling With Love. Since then, the film has also been known as The New Lord of the Village; this title was used for David Shepard's restoration released to home video in 2008. In French, the film has also been referred to as On ne badine pas avec l'amour (literally "No Trifling with Love").
