= Column wave =

Stage machine created to mimic movement of the ocean

The column wave is a 16th-century stage machine created to mimic movement of the ocean.

Developed by Nicola Sabbatini, the machine was an effective way to give the appearance of a wave-filled sea. It was used to great effect through the following centuries. The machine was documented in Practica di Fabricar Scene e Machine ne' Teatri as the third method of showing a sea.

The column wave was built by attaching slightly bent bars through cylinders made of wood and burlap. The burlap was painted blue and black (with hints of silver for the whitecaps). These tubes were attached to cranks that, when turned, made the stretched burlap quiver while the disks created a flowing motion. Combining several of these in a row gave the audience a more realistic sea than had been seen on stage before.
