= French Cops Learning English =

- Directed by: Georges Méliès
- Production company: Star Film Company
- Release date: August 1908
- Running time: 138 meters
- Country: France
- Language: Silent

French Cops Learning English, originally copyrighted in the United States as French Interpreter Policeman, is a 1908 French short silent comedy film directed by Georges Méliès. It was released by Méliès's Star Film Company and is numbered 1288–1293 in its catalogues.

== Plot ==
In a room labelled "English School under the management of Miss Blackford," four French policemen and their chief are practicing English words. Miss Blackford, writing "What a fair fish" on her blackboard, tells one of the policemen to translate it into French; his attempt is "Va te faire fiche." The process repeats, with "Very well thank you" translated as "Manivelle St. Cloud." Miss Blackford, holding up a placard reading "Conversation," lets in four young English ladies; the policemen and ladies court each other fervently.

The lesson is interrupted by the entrance of a higher-ranking officer, a Police Inspector, who is appalled at the sight of the police force in chaotic flirtation. However, when the "Conversation" placard is shown to him by way of explanation, he is immediately appeased, and nods cheerfully. The entire classroom bursts into a raucous can-can dance as the Inspector holds up a placard reading "Entente Cordiale."

== Production ==
In 1908, the Motion Picture Patents Company changed the standardized prices used in the American film market, with films priced systematically by length. Though previous price standardizations had been useful to Méliès, the 1908 changes worked against him and contributed to his financial difficulties; under the new standards, his carefully planned and executed films were too expensive and time-consuming to make a profit. In an attempt to keep up with the new demands, Méliès doubled his output in 1908, turning out simpler films as quickly as possible from his two glass studios in Montreuil, Seine-Saint-Denis.

French Cops Learning English was filmed in Méliès's original glass studio, Studio A, rather than the larger and newer Studio B. Méliès plays the Police Inspector.

As the placard at the end of the film suggests, the film is a topical comedy about the Entente Cordiale established in 1904 between Great Britain and France. During the Entente, English tourists flocked to Paris; by 1907, they were so common that the Parisian Prefect of Police, Louis Lépine, formed a squad of police interpreters to help tourists overcome the language barrier. Méliès used the topical subject to poke fun of the police in their roles as authority figures, a recurring theme in his films.

As Richard Abel has noted, Méliès's set is designed on a rigorously geometrical layout, emphasizing the systematic and marionette-like antics of the police students. Miss Blackford's outfit is that of a gommeuse, a sensual and eccentrically comic type of café concert singer. The extensive use of placards and other written text is unusual for a Méliès film, but necessary for plot comprehension, and especially for the wordplay.
