= Fernande Albany =

French actress (1889–1966)

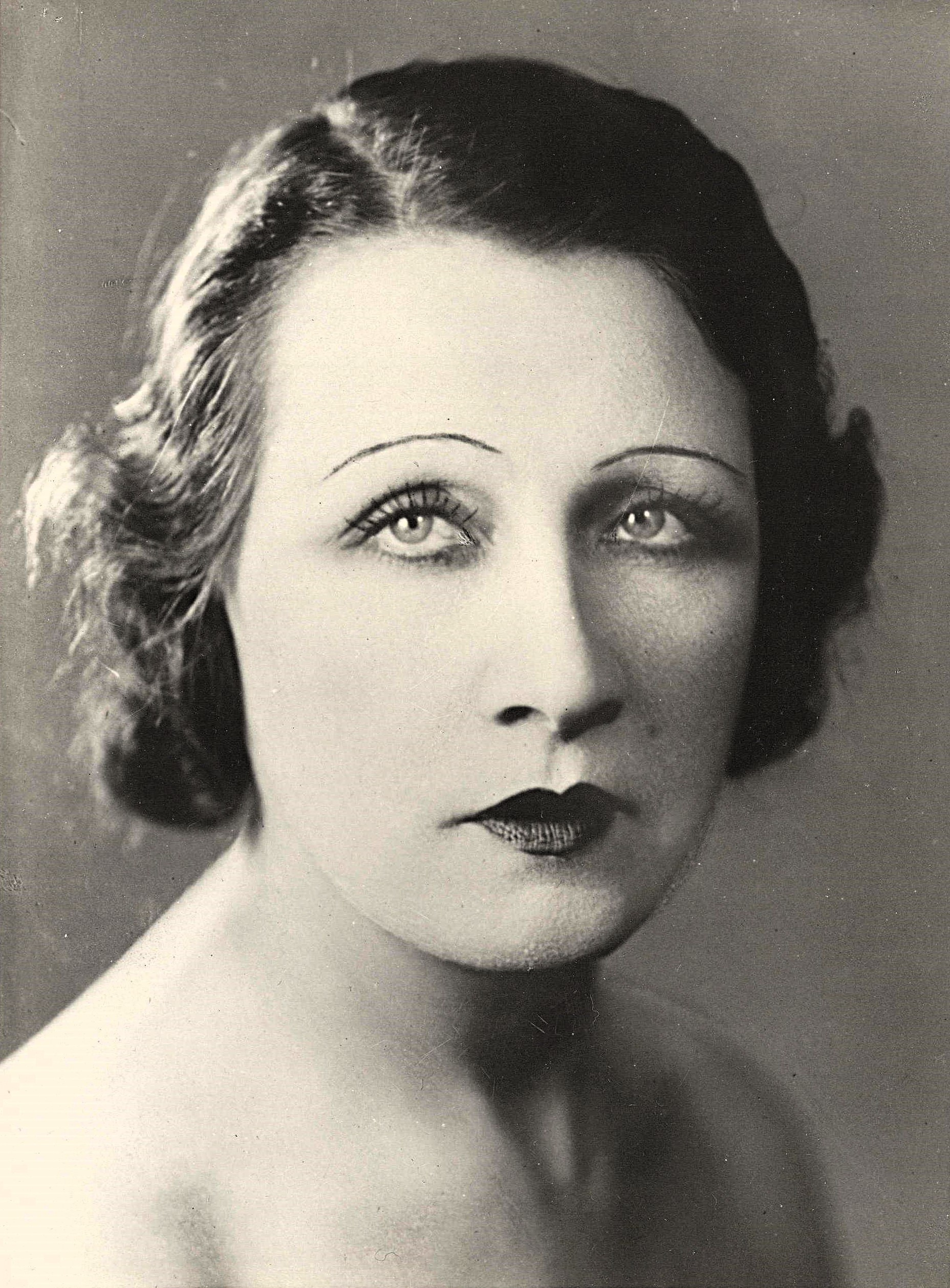
- Portrait of Fernande Albany
- Born: Fernande Françoise Raoult; 22 December 1889
- Died: 25 November 1966 (aged 76)
- Occupation: Actress

Fernande Françoise Raoult, known professionally as Fernande Albany (22 December 1889, Lison – 25 November 1966, Paris), was a French actress in theatre and film.

== Career ==
Albany appeared in many of the films of Georges Méliès.

Her work on the Parisian stage included roles in L'alcôve de Marianne by Félix Gandera (Théâtre de l'Athénée, 1920), Les Fontaines lumineuses by Georges Berr and Louis Verneuil (Théâtre des Variétés, 1935), and Crépuscule du théâtre by Henri-René Lenormand (Théâtre du Vieux-Colombier, 1937).

Albany was married to the French stage and film actor Charles Dechamps.

== Filmography ==
=== Silent films ===
- 1904 : Voyage à travers l'impossible (English title: The Impossible Voyage, or An Impossible Voyage or Whirling the Worlds) (dir. Georges Méliès)
- 1905 : Le Raid Paris-Monte Carlo en deux heures (An Adventurous Automobile Trip) (dir. Georges Méliès)
- 1907 : Le Tunnel sous la Manche ou le Cauchemar franco-anglais (English title: Tunneling the English Channel) (dir. Georges Méliès)
- 1907 : Le Mariage de Victorine (English title: How Bridget's Lover Escaped) (dir. Georges Méliès)
- 1907 : Pauvre John ou Les aventures d'un buveur de whiskey (English title: Sightseeing Through Whisky) (dir. Georges Méliès)
- 1907 : Il y a un dieu pour les ivrognes (English title: The Good Luck of a "Souse") (dir. Georges Méliès)
- 1908 : Le Nouveau Seigneur du village (English title: The New Lord of the Village) (dir. Georges Méliès)
- 1908 : Photographie électrique à distance (English title: Long Distance Wireless Photography (US) and Electrical Photographer (UK)) (dir. Georges Méliès)
- 1908 : Les Patineurs (English title: The Woes of Roller Skaters) (dir. Georges Méliès)
- 1908 : Épreuves ou les malheurs d'un savetier (English title: Tribulations; or the Misfortunes of a Cobbler) (dir. Georges Méliès)
- 1908 : Pour l'étoile S.V.P. (English title: Buncoed Stage Johnnie (dir. Georges Méliès)
- 1908 : Salon de coiffure (English title: In the Barber Shop) (dir. Georges Méliès)
- 1908 : No Trifling With Love
- 1911 : À la conquête du pôle (English title: The Conquest of the Pole) (dir. Georges Méliès)
- 1916 : Trop gratter cuit (dir. Fernand Rivers)
- 1920 : Les Femmes collantes (dir. Pierre Caron)
- 1931 : Caught in the Act (dir. Georges Tréville and Hanns Schwarz)

=== Sound films ===
- 1934 : 'N'épouse pas ta fille (dir. Willy Rozier)
- 1936 : Le Mort en fuite (English title: Death on the Run)
- 1961 : Le Nain (telefilm)
- 1965 : Le Naïf amoureux
