= How Bridget's Lover Escaped =

- Directed by: Georges Méliès
- Starring: Fernande Albany
- Production company: Star Film Company
- Release date: 1907
- Running time: 142 meters
- Country: France
- Language: Silent

How Bridget's Lover Escaped (French: Le Mariage de Victorine), also known as Le Mariage de Victoire, is a 1907 French short silent comedy film directed by Georges Méliès.

== Production ==
The cast includes Fernande Albany as the cook (Victorine in the French release of the film, Bridget in the American version), and the actor Manuel as her fiancé the fireman. The scene outside the house was filmed outdoors, using Méliès's own house in Montreuil, Seine-Saint-Denis.

The film includes examples of substitution splicing, as well as two experimental techniques relatively rare in Méliès's films: a three-scene cross-cutting sequence, and a medium shot used to give the audience a final glimpse of the cook and her fiancé.

== Release ==
The film was released by Méliès's Star Film Company and is numbered 929–935 in its catalogues. It was registered for American copyright at the Library of Congress on 26 April 1907. The film's release was first advertised in the press on 1 July 1907, in the Phono-Ciné-Gazette.

An unedited print of the film on 16mm stock survives at the Library of Congress.
