= The Good Luck of a "Souse" =

1908 film by Georges Méliès

- Surviving footage from The Good Luck of a "Souse"
- Directed by: Georges Méliès
- Starring: Manuel; Fernande Albany; Georges Méliès?
- Production company: Star Film Company
- Release date: 1907
- Country: France
- Language: Silent

The Good Luck of a "Souse" (French: Il y a un dieu pour les ivrognes) is a 1907 French short silent film by Georges Méliès. The film, of which only a fragment is known to survive, centered on a drunkard whose family is saved from violence, and who finally is able to give up his alcoholism, thanks to a series of happy accidents.

== Plot ==
In a saloon, a drunkard is in such a bad state that the police are called in to carry him away and bring him home. His arriving there wakes up his sleeping wife and daughter; when they remonstrate him for his drunkenness, he reacts violently and pushes them both out of a window. By miraculous good luck, both survive the attack; the daughter falls into a peddler's basket, and the wife gets caught on the side of the building as she falls.

The drunkard, believing himself to have murdered his family, is shocked into sobriety and attempts to hang himself. However, the rope breaks just as a police officer comes in, leading the wife and daughter. The ex-drunkard pledges never to touch another drop of alcohol, and the whole family is happy.

== Production ==
An actor known as Manuel, who frequently collaborated with Méliès, plays the drunkard, with Fernande Albany as a passerby and possibly Méliès himself as the police commissioner. Like many of the films Méliès made around this time, especially into 1908, the film was shot partly in his studio in Montreuil-sous-Bois, and partly outdoors on the surrounding property; the Méliès family house is visible in the film. Only one special effect was used, the substitution splice.

The film imitates the realistic style that the rival French studios Pathé and Gaumont had begun developing, with considerable commercial success, in 1906. It can be compared particularly to some of the films made by Pathé by Ferdinand Zecca, such as L'Alcoolisme engendre la Tuberculose (1905), L'Incendiaire (1905), and L'Assommoir (1908). It is unclear whether Méliès or Manuel was in charge of staging.

== Release and survival ==
The Good Luck of a "Souse" was sold by Méliès's Star Film Company and is numbered 1044–1049 in its catalogues. A fragment of the film survives; the rest is presumed lost.
