= Séverin Cafferra =

French mime (1863–1930)

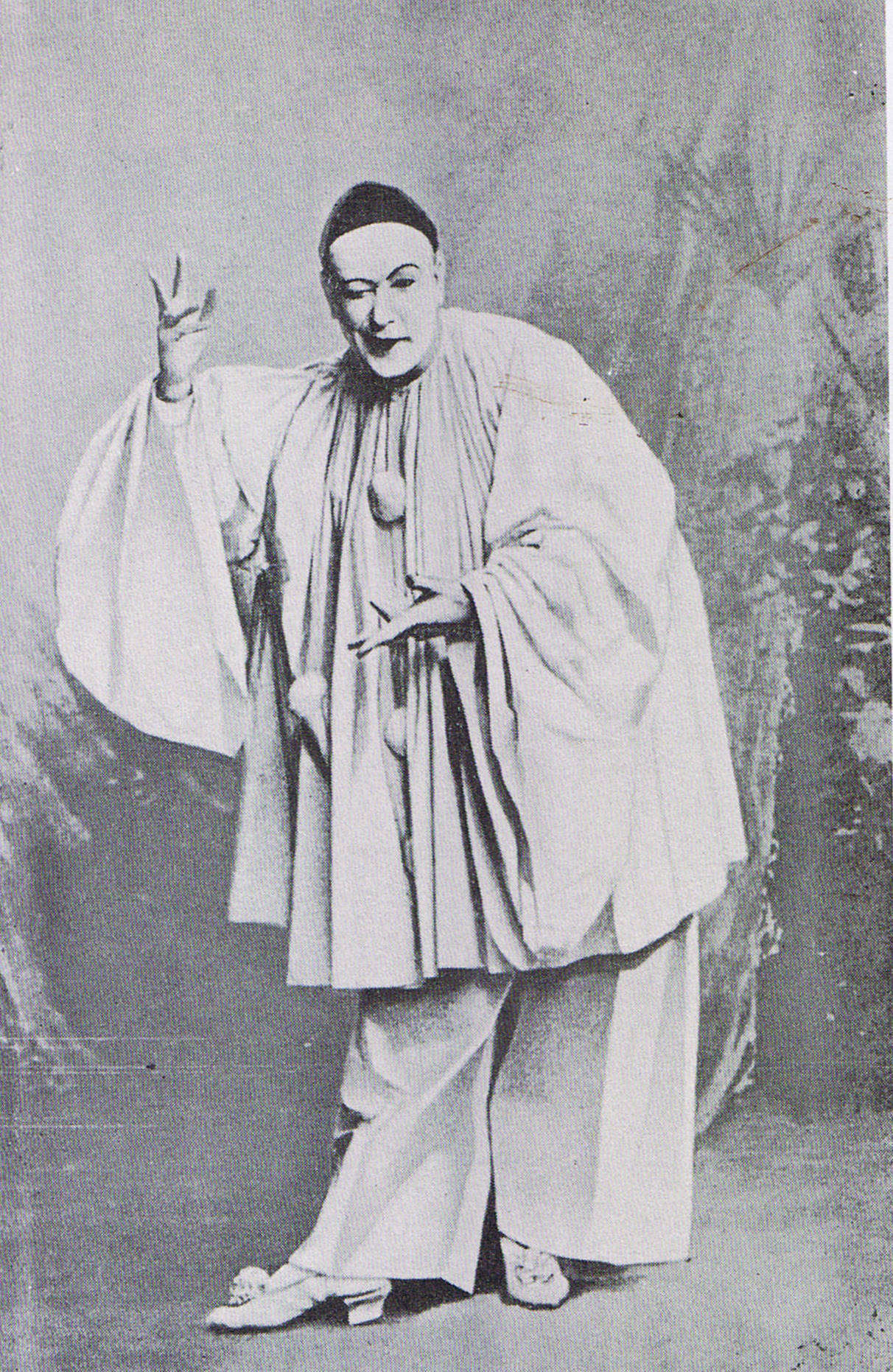
Séverin as Pierrot, c. 1896, in Séverin, L'Homme Blanc (Paris, 1929)

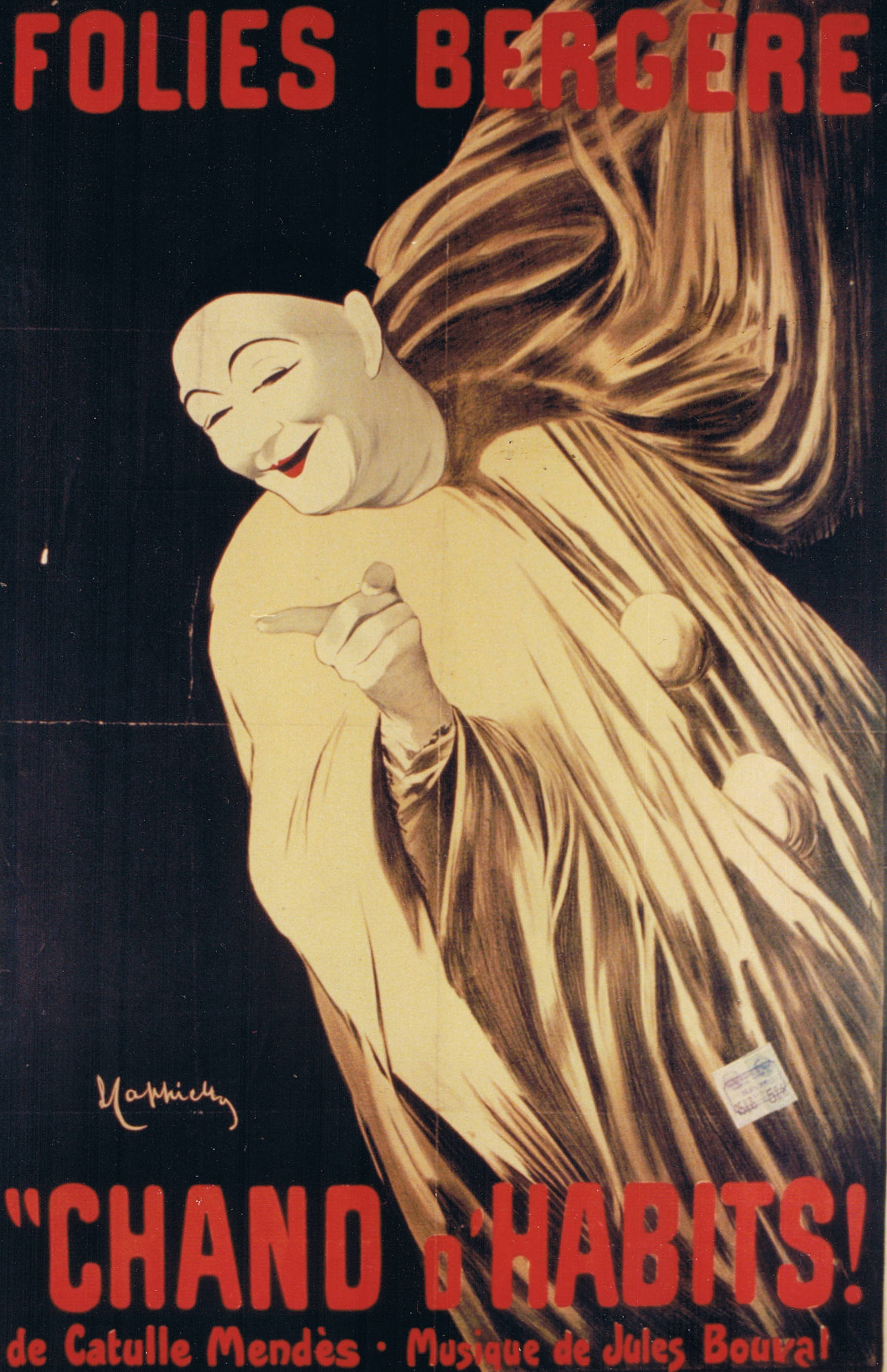
Happichy: Séverin in Mendès's Chand d'habits!, poster (1896)

Séverin Cafferra, known as Séverin or mime Séverin (1863-1930), was one of the best-known French Pierrots or mime artists around the turn of the twentieth century.

== Life ==
Caffera was born in Ajaccio, Corsica. He studied under the Marseille mime Louis Rouffe (1849-1885), who in turn had studied under Charles Deburau. He worked at Marseille, then at the Théatre des Funambules in Paris. In his 1929 book, L'Homme Blanc : souvenirs d'un Pierrot, Caffera describes Rouffe as having created a complete language of gesture.

== Bibliography ==
- Caffera, Séverin (named simply Séverin as author). L'Homme Blanc : souvenirs d'un Pierrot ("The Man in White: Memories of a Clown"). Introduction and notes by Gustave Fréjaville, Paris, Plon, 1929.
