= Victor de Cottens =

French dramatist, librettist and stage director

Victor de Cottens (21 August 1862 – 26 February 1956) was a French dramatist, librettist, stage director, and theatre critic.

De Cottens was born in Paris. For the Folies Bergère, he directed every edition of the Revue des Folies-Bergère produced by Émile and Vincent Isola; each of these revues offered various acts linked by two commentators, the commère and compère. Between 1908 and 1911, he and H. B. Marinelli ran the Olympia music hall in Paris. He and E. Danancier collaborated as interim directors of the Théâtre du Vaudeville in Paris when that theatre, closed at the beginning of the First World War, reopened on 2 April 1915.

He died in Paris in 1956.
