= Stage machinery =

Mechanical devices used in stage productions

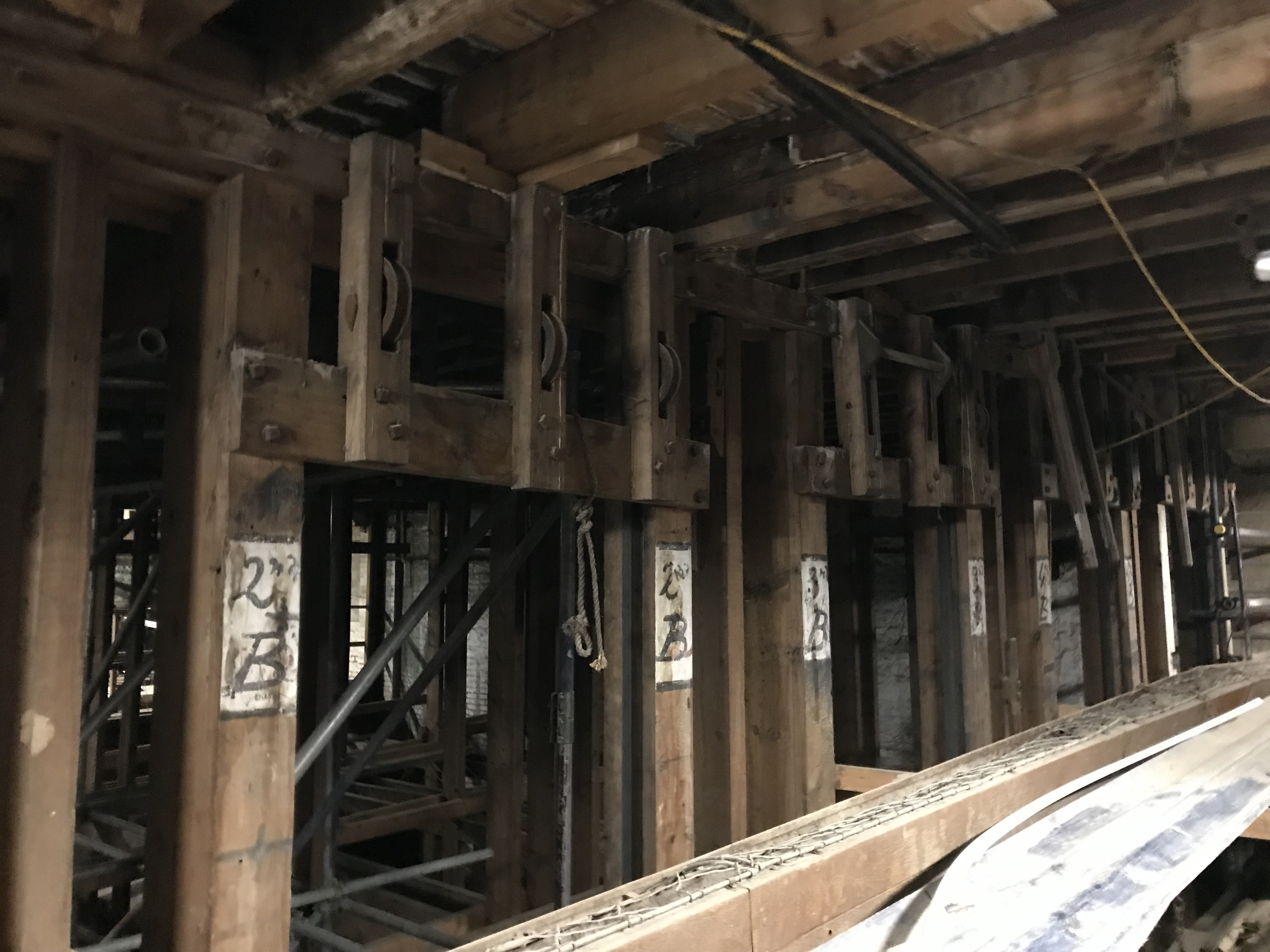
Stage machinery at Alexandra Palace Theatre

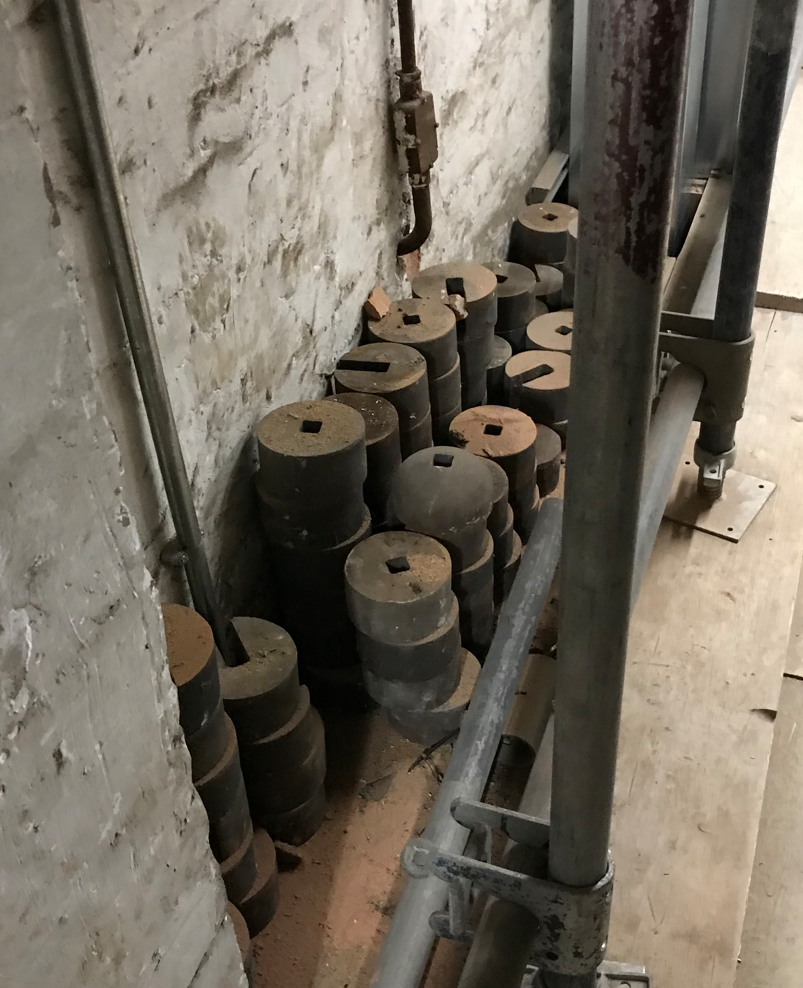
Weights used with stage machinery at Alexandra Palace Theatre

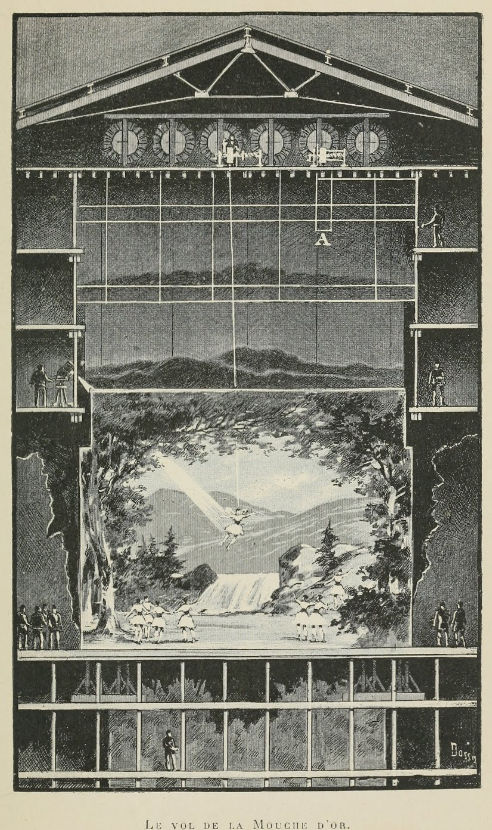
Illustration from 'Trucs et décors' showing how Victorian stage machinery was used to achieve special effects

Stage machinery, also known as stage mechanics, comprises the mechanical devices used to create special effects in theatrical productions, including scene changes, lowering actors through the stage floor (traps) and enabling actors to 'fly' over the stage.

Alexandra Palace Theatre, London and the Gaiety Theatre, Isle of Man are two theatres which have retained stage machinery of all types under the stage.

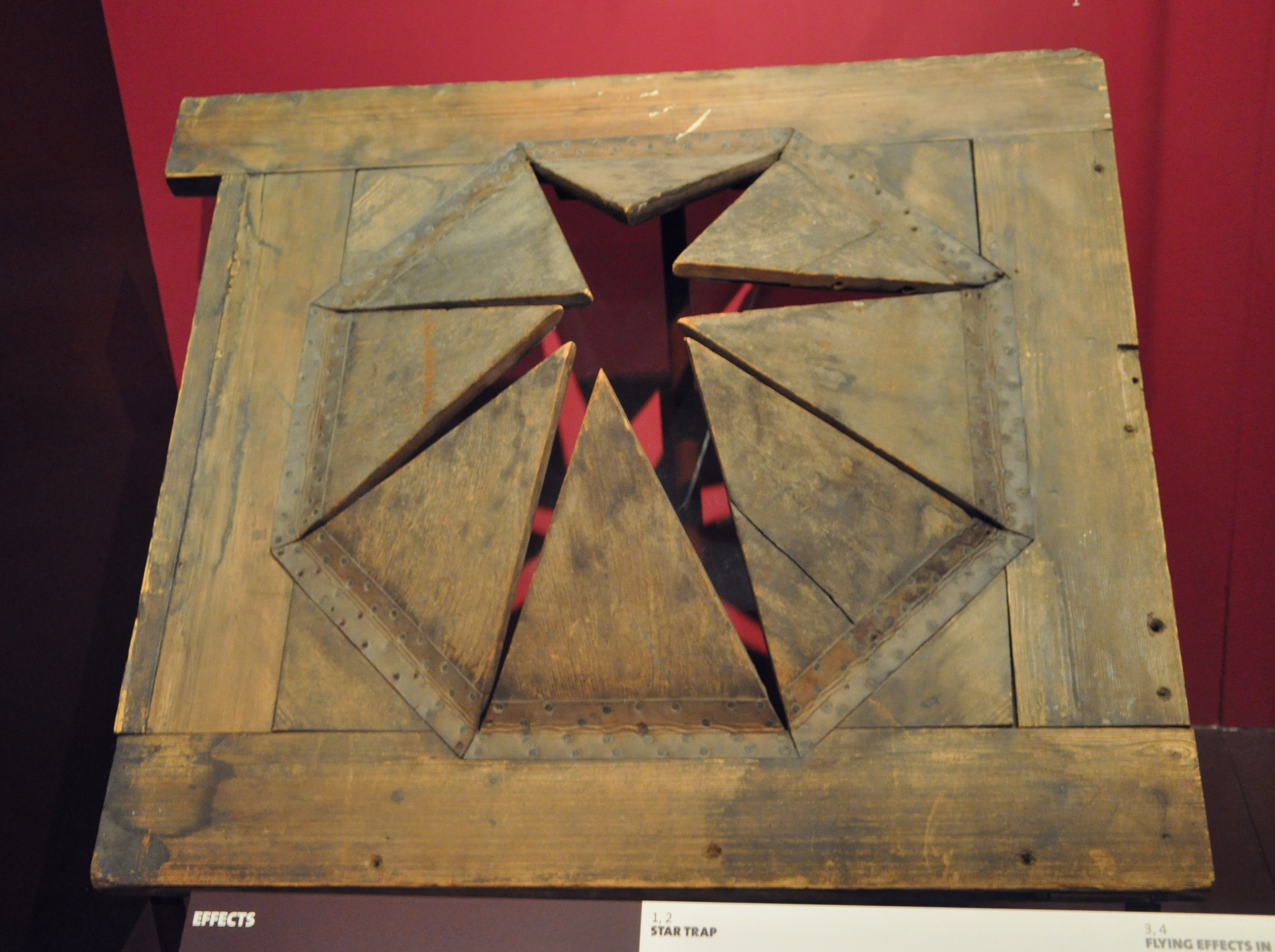
Star Trap at Drury Lane Theatre

== Scene changing ==
The wings of a theatre stage had to be at least half the width of the stage each side of the proscenium arch and the fly system for flying scenery had to be twice the height of the stage.

=== Drum and shaft ===
This consisted of a shaft around which was built one or more circular drums which had a much larger diameter than the shaft. A rope wound round the drum was pulled in order to rotate the shaft and if there was more than one drum on the shaft, several pieces of scenery could be moved at the same time to raise the scenery wings and backdrops.

=== Slote/sloat ===
This was a pair of vertical runners used to raise or lower a long profile of low scenery such as a groundrow, pieces of scenery made of canvas stretched over wood and used to represent items such as water or flowers, through a narrow slot in the stage floor.

=== Column wave ===
The column wave, developed by the Italian architect Nicola Sabbatini, was a 16th-century stage machine used to provide the appearance waves on the sea.

=== Bridge ===
This was a heavy wooden platform with counterweights which were used to raise and lower either heavy pieces of scenery or a group of actors, from below the stage to stage level.

=== Scruto ===
Scruto consisted of narrow strips of wood attached side by side on canvas material forming a continuous sheet which could be rolled. The scruto could be mounted vertically and rolled up or down to change the scenery or horizontally in the stage floor to form a trap cover.

== Traps ==
Anapiesma was the ancient Greek version of the stage trap we know today. It was a concealed opening under the stage floor, where actors and props would be hidden before they appeared on stage. The joists of the stage floor were cut and the opening was concealed in different ways, depending on the type of trap. In the 19th century many different kinds of traps were used. All except the Corsican trap were located downstage near the proscenium arch.

The trap room is the large space below the stage where actors prepared to make their entrance and where the winches, drums and other machinery needed to operate traps and scenery were kept. It was referred to as "hell".

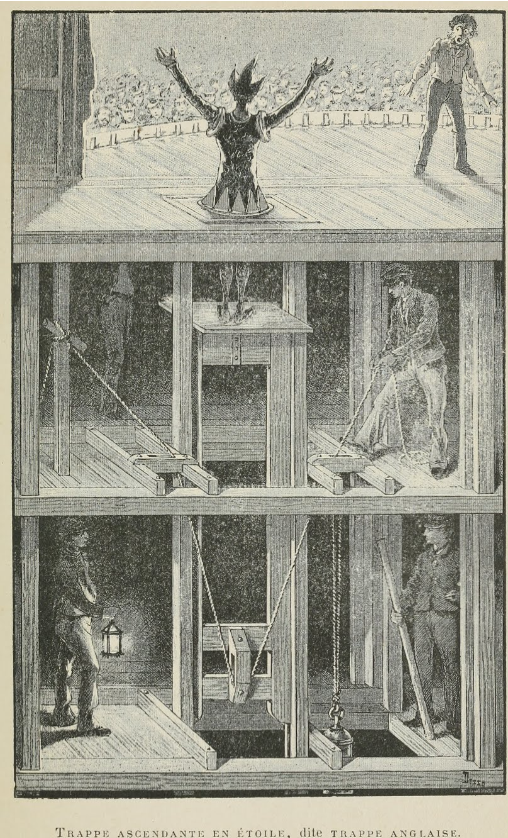
Illustration from 'Trucs et décors' showing an ascending star hatch, known as the English trap

Newspaper advertisements looked for trap performers and newspaper notices for shows might advertise how high a performer flew out of a trap.

=== Grave trap ===
This trap was positioned centrally and was named after its use in Shakespeare's Hamlet. It measured about 6 by 3 feet and consisted of a platform below the stage which could be raised or lowered.

=== Star trap ===
These were counterweighted traps which could be used to allow actors playing supernatural beings, such as ghosts in melodrama and demons and fairies in pantomime, to appear suddenly.

The hole through which the actor appeared consisted of triangular flaps, hinged with leather, which opened upwards, resembling a star. The actor stood on a small platform below the trap and counterweights of up to 200 kg, attached to the platform, were raised by stage hands using ropes, at which point the platform moved up rapidly and the actor 'flew' through the trap. The trap closed immediately with no visible opening, giving the illusion that the actor had appeared through the solid stage floor. The star traps were hazardous. The first pantomime at Alexandra Palace Theatre, 'The Yellow Dwarf' had to be delayed when an actor twisted his spine and sprained muscles in his back in preparation for the role. Despite this, they were still used in the first half of the 20th century until banned by the actors' union Equity.

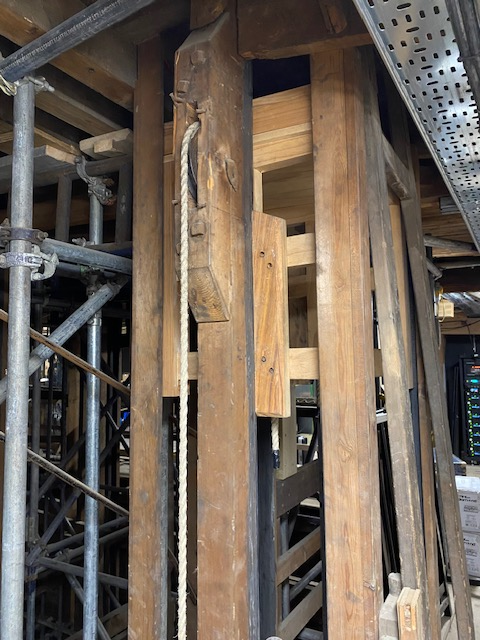
A trap housed under the stage at Alexandra Palace Theatre

=== Bristle trap ===
To create bristle traps the wood in the stage floor was replaced by bristles which were painted to match the stage floor.

=== Vampire trap ===
This trap was invented for the James Planché 1820 adaption of Polidori's The Vampyre. It involved two hinged traps in the stage floor that an actor could step through in order to vanish from the stage. The trap then immediately closed, giving the impression that the actor was passing through solid matter.

=== Leap trap ===
This trap consisted of two hinged traps in scenery that an actor could step through in a single jump to either enter or leave the stage. It closed immediately, giving the impression that the actor was passing through solid matter.

=== Corsican trap ===
These traps used a counterweighted platform and slatted shutters, sometimes made of scruto, which allowed an actor to rise through the stage floor while at the same time moving across it. It was developed for the play The Corsican Brothers by Dion Boucicault, in which the ghost of a murdered man rose slowly across the stage and through the stage floor to haunt his twin brother. It was played at the Princess's Theatre London in 1852. It consisted of a bristle trap set between 2 long sliders positioned across the stage, the first drawing the trap across the stage and the second closing behind. The actor stood on a small truck which ran along an inclined track below the stage which started 6 feet below the stage and rose to stage level. The only working Corsican trap in the world now is at the Gaiety Theatre in the Isle of Man, where they also have a model demonstrating how it works

=== Cauldron trap ===
This trap, named from the witches' scene in Macbeth, was usually just a square opening through which items could be passed into a bottomless cauldron.

=== Corner traps ===
These had an area of about 2 feet square, covered by a piece of scruto and would have been situated at each side of the stage near the proscenium arch. They could be used to raise or lower a person through the stage. This idea was further developed in Italy in the late 14th century using ropes and pulleys so that many actors could descend or ascend together.

== Flying machines ==
Theatrical machinery was used by the Greeks in the 5th century BC to lower actors to the stage. In England, by the end of the 18th century, diagrams of complicated flights were drawn and by the mid 19th century the fly systems used consisted of pulleys and counterweights. Towards the end of the 19th century, George Kirby founded a company specifically for equipment used for flying actors and produced the effects needed to fly actors in the early productions of Peter Pan. George's son Joseph continued the business and founded Kirby's Flying Ballet troupe, which performed in the first half of the 20th century. The lines to which the actors were attached were known as Kirby lines.
