= Cinderella (1899 film) =

1899 French trick film

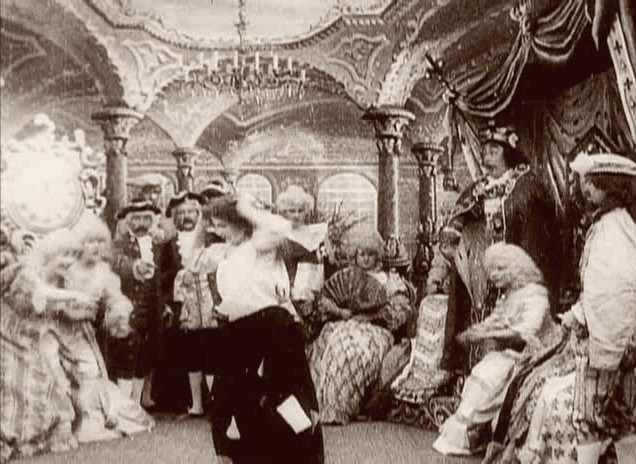
- A scene from the film
- Directed by: Georges Méliès
- Based on: Cinderella by Charles Perrault
- Produced by: Georges Méliès
- Starring: Mlle Barral; Bleuette Bernon; Jeanne d'Alcy; Georges Méliès
- Release dates: October 1899 (France); 25 December 1899 (United States)
- Running time: 6 minutes
- Country: France
- Language: Silent

The film itself, with score added

Cinderella (French: Cendrillon) is an 1899 French trick film directed by Georges Méliès, based on the fairy tale by Charles Perrault. It was released by Méliès's Star Film Company and is numbered 219–224 in its catalogues, where it is advertised as a grande féerie extraordinaire en 20 tableaux.

It is the first known film adaptation of the classic fairy tale.

== Cast ==
The casts of Méliès's films are in many cases unidentified. Most of the following listing is based on cast identifications made by the film scholars Georges Sadoul, Jacques Malthête, and Laurent Mannoni.

- Mlle Barral as Cinderella. Barral had also acted in Méliès's bedroom farce The Bridegroom's Dilemma earlier that year.
- Bleuette Bernon as the Fairy Godmother. Méliès discovered Bernon in the 1890s, when she was performing as a singer at the cabaret L'Enfer. Her appearance in Cinderella is contemporaneous with her performances at the Eldorado cabaret. She also appeared as Phoebe, the woman on the crescent moon, in Méliès's famous A Trip to the Moon.
- Carmelli as the Prince. Carmelli was an actor at Méliès's theater of stage illusions, the Théâtre Robert-Houdin in Paris.
- Jehanne d'Alcy as the Prince's mother, the Queen. D'Alcy had achieved success in theatrical productions by 1896, but left the stage to devote herself to film, becoming one of the first performers to do so. She appeared in many of Méliès's films and later became his second wife.
- Dupeyron as a party guest.
- Georges Méliès as the genie of the midnight clock, and as a halberdier. All told, Méliès took an acting role in at least 300 of his 520 films.

== Production ==
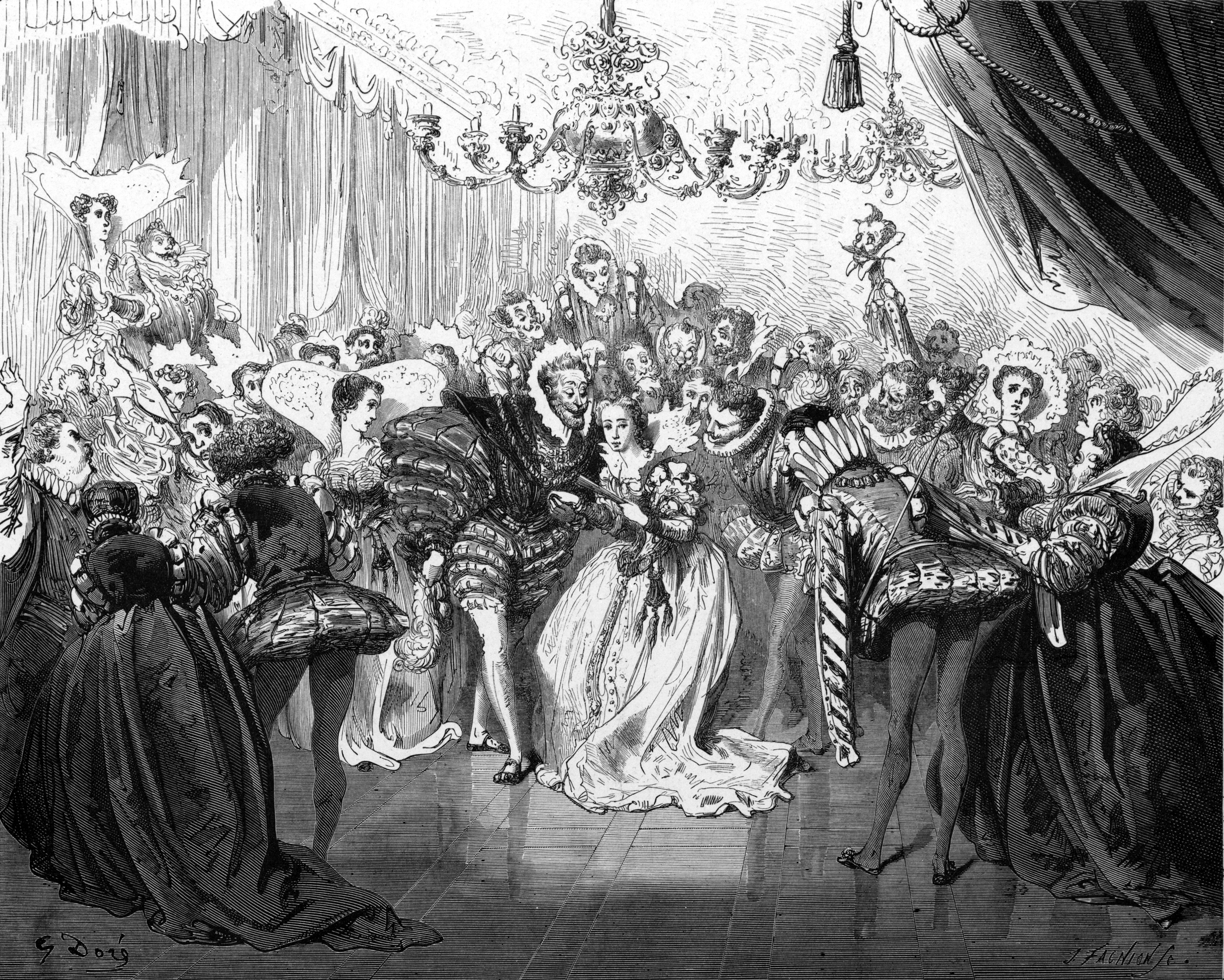
Gustave Doré's illustrations were influential to Méliès

Méliès modeled the film's visual style on the engravings of Gustave Doré, who had illustrated the story for an edition of Perrault's fairy tales. (Doré was stylistically influential across Méliès's career, especially in this film and in his film adaptations of four other works Doré had illustrated: Red Riding Hood, Blue Beard, The Wandering Jew, and Baron Munchausen's Dream.) The direct inspiration for the film of Cinderella was probably a stage adaptation premiered in 1896 by the Théâtre de la Galerie-Vivienne and played by the Troupe Raymond at Méliès's own theatre of illusions, the Théatre Robert-Houdin, at Christmastime of 1897. Méliès may also have been inspired by the Théâtre du Châtelet's lavish 1895 stage production of the story.

Cinderella was Méliès's first film with multiple scenes (tableaux), using six distinct sets and five changes of scene within the film. (His catalogue, by dividing the action into smaller beats, lists twenty tableaux within the film, a generous numbering probably devised for publicity reasons.) So many extras were used in Cinderella that Méliès designated a Chief Extra to lead them. The film's special effects were created with multiple exposures, dissolves, and substitution splices.

== Reception ==
Cinderella was Méliès's first major cinematic success. It did well both in French fairground cinemas and at European and American music-halls, and inspired Méliès to create other lavishly designed storytelling films with multiple scenes. His next film with multiple scenes, Joan of Arc (1900), was his first to surpass 200 meters of film in length, and was also a marked success. According to the film historian Lewis Jacobs, Cinderella's use of spectacle on screen also influenced the films of Cecil B. DeMille.

Méliès made another adaptation of the story, Cinderella or the Glass Slipper, in 1912 under the supervision of Pathé Frères. This version was not a success, partially because of directorial conflict between Méliès, Ferdinand Zecca, and Charles Pathé, and partially because Méliès's theatrical style had fallen out of fashion by 1912.
