= Barbe-bleue =

Barbe-bleue may refer to:

- Barbe-bleue (opera), opéra bouffe in three acts by Jacques Offenbach
- Barbe-bleue, a 1943 radio opera by Jacques Ibert
- Barbe-bleue (film), silent French crime film

== See also ==
- Bluebeard (disambiguation)
