= The Barber of Seville (1904 film) =

Le Barbier de Séville
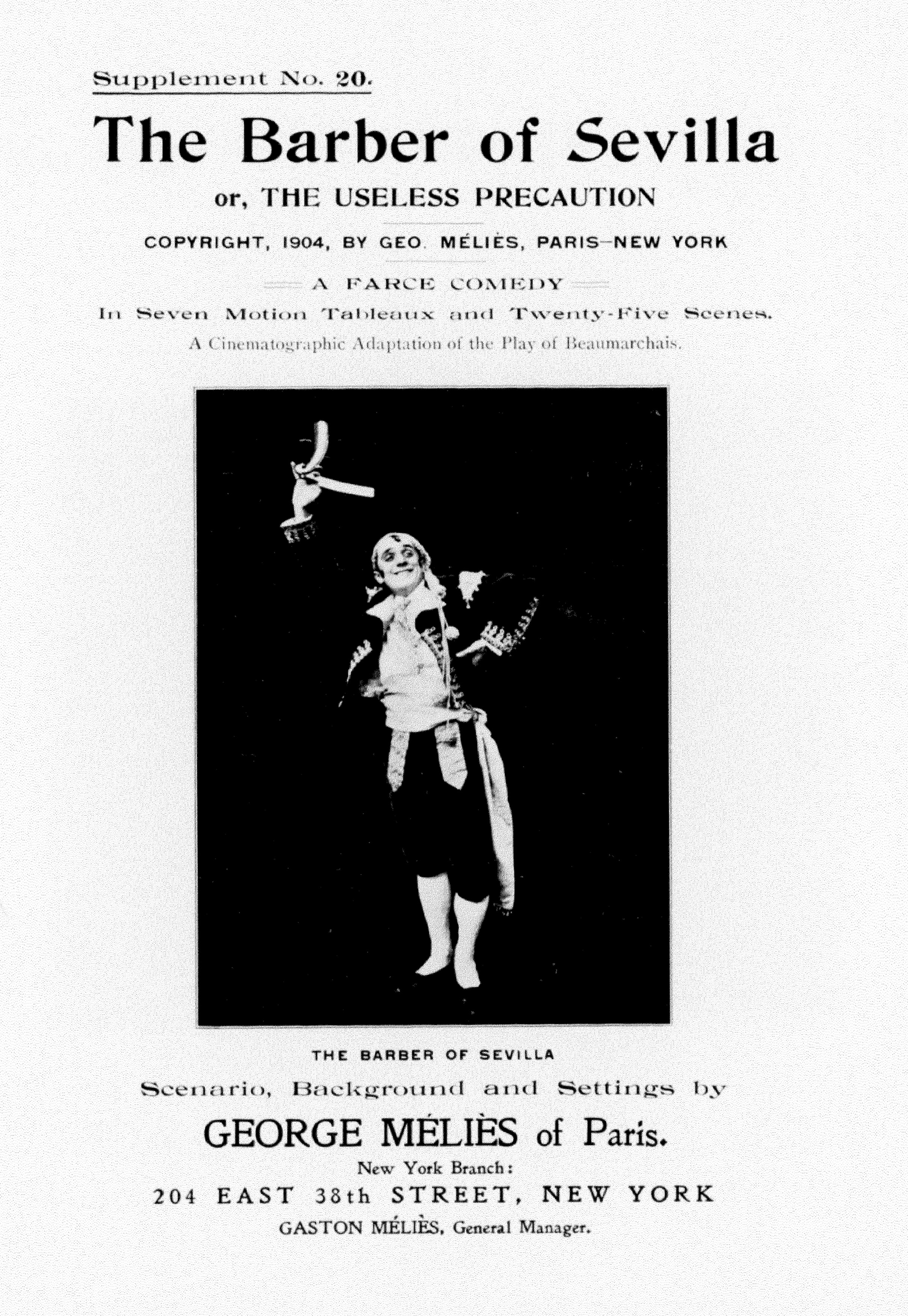
- Cover of a 1904 brochure advertising the film
- Directed by: Georges Méliès
- Based on: The Barber of Seville by Pierre Beaumarchais
- Release date: 1904
- Running time: 22 minutes 412 meters/1340 feet 295 meters/960 feet (abridged)
- Country: France
- Language: Silent

The Barber of Seville (French: Le Barbier de Séville), also released as The Barber of Sevilla, or the Useless Precaution, was a 1904 French silent film directed by Georges Méliès, based on the 1775 play of the same name by Pierre Beaumarchais. It was released by Méliès's Star Film Company and is numbered 606–625 in its catalogues, where it was advertised as a comédie burlesque en 7 actes, d'après Beaumarchais. Like several other of Méliès's longer films, two versions were released simultaneously: a complete 22-minute print and an abridged print.

As with his 1904 film Faust and Marguerite, Méliès prepared a special film score for The Barber of Seville, adapted from the most well-known arias from the Rossini opera. Like at least 4% of Méliès's entire output (including such films as A Trip to the Moon, The Impossible Voyage, The Kingdom of the Fairies, and The Rajah's Dream), some prints were individually hand-colored and sold at a higher price.

The film is currently presumed lost.
