= Bleuette Bernon =

French actress

- Born: 6 June 1878; 14th arrondissement of Paris, France
- Died: 15 June 1937 (aged 59); France
- Occupation: Film actress
- Children: Marianne Cantrelle
- Relatives: Jacqueline Cantrelle

Bleuette Bernon (6 June 1878 – 15 June 1937) was a French press actress who appeared in at least five films made by Georges Méliès around the turn of the 20th century. The early films, made before 1900, were usually without plot and had a runtime of just a few minutes. However, Méliès evolved the genre of the fictional motion picture, and Bernon became one of the early character actors in movies. In 1899, she played the title character in Méliès's Jeanne d'Arc, and Cinderella in Cendrillon. In 1901, she appeared in Barbe-bleue. In 1902 she appeared in a minor role in A Trip to the Moon, which is the best known film of Méliès, as one "lady in the Moon". In 1903 she appeared as Aurora in Le Royaume des fées.
