= Oscar de Lagoanère =

French composer

Antoine Ferdinand Oscar de Lagoanère (24 August 1851 – 23 May 1918) was a French composer and conductor from Bordeaux. He was a conductor for several theaters and wrote numerous operettas. From 1908 to 1914 he was the director of music for the Théâtre de la Gaîté in Paris. His works include Les deux panthères, Fillette et loup-Garou, Un ménage au violon, L'étape d'un 27 jours, Il était une fois, Le cocheur de la mariée, Néron, Les sept péchés capitaux, Le cadeau d'Alain, and L'habit de César. He also wrote the music for Voyage à travers l'impossible (Journey Through the Impossible), an 1882 play by Jules Verne and Adolphe d'Ennery. He died in Paris on 23 May 1918.
