= A Trip to the Moon =

1902 French short film by Georges Méliès

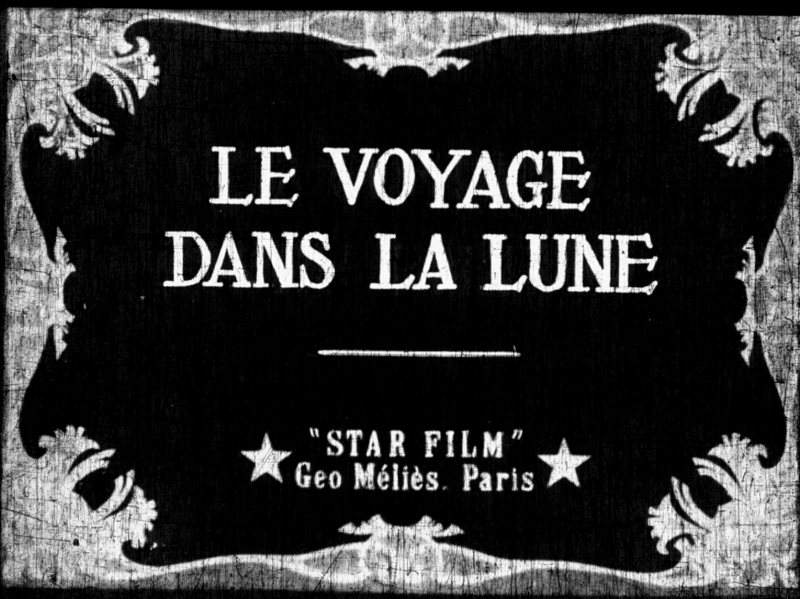
- The film's title card
- Directed by: Georges Méliès
- Written by: Georges Méliès
- Produced by: Georges Méliès
- Starring: Georges Méliès; Bleuette Bernon; François Lallement; Henri Delannoy
- Cinematography: Théophile Michault; Lucien Tainguy
- Edited by: Georges Méliès
- Production company: Star Film Company
- Release date: 1 September 1902
- Running time: 260 metres/845 feet; 18 minutes (12 frame/s); 16 minutes (14 frame/s); 14 minutes (16 frame/s); 9 minutes (24 frame/s)
- Country: France
- Language: Silent
- Budget: ₣10,000

A Trip to the Moon (French: Le Voyage dans la Lune [lə vwajaʒ dɑ̃ la lyn], transl. "The Journey into the Moon") (Note: A Trip to the Moon, the common English-language title, was first used in Méliès's American catalogues. It was initially labelled in British catalogues as Trip to the Moon, without the initial article. Similarly, although the film was first sold in France without an initial article in the title, it has subsequently been commonly known as Le Voyage dans la Lune.) is a 1902 French science-fiction adventure trick film written, directed and produced by Georges Méliès. Inspired by the Jules Verne novel From the Earth to the Moon (1865) and its sequel Around the Moon (1870), the film follows a group of astronomers who travel to the Moon in a cannon-propelled capsule, explore the Moon's surface, escape from an underground group of Selenites (lunar inhabitants), and return to Earth with a captive Selenite. Méliès leads an ensemble cast of French theatrical performers as the main character Professor Barbenfouillis.

Although the film disappeared into obscurity after Méliès's retirement from the film industry, it was rediscovered around 1930, when Méliès's importance to the history of cinema was beginning to be recognised by film devotees. An original hand-coloured print was discovered in 1993, and restored in 2011.

A Trip to the Moon was ranked 84th among the 100 greatest films of the 20th century by The Village Voice. The film remains Méliès' best-known, and the moment when the capsule lands (in the moon's eye) remains one of the most iconic, and frequently referenced, images in the history of cinema.

== Plot ==
The full film

Hand-coloured version of A Trip to the Moon

At a meeting of the Astronomy Club, its president, Professor Barbenfouillis, (Note: Proper names taken from the authorized English-language catalogue description of the film: see Méliès 2011a, pp. 227–29.) (Note: Barbenfouillis is French for "Tangled-Beard". The name probably parodies President Impey Barbicane, the hero of Jules Verne's From the Earth to the Moon; Méliès had previously used the name in a different context in 1891, for the stage magic act "Le Décapité Recalcitrant".) proposes an expedition to the Moon. After addressing some dissent, five other brave astronomers—Nostradamus, (Note: The name of the purported prophet.) Alcofrisbas, (Note: Alcofribas was a pseudonym of François Rabelais.) Omega, Micromegas, (Note: The name of a space traveller from Voltaire's story of the same name.) and Parafaragaramus—agree to the plan. A space capsule in the shape of a bullet is built, along with a huge cannon to shoot it into space. The astronomers embark and their capsule is fired from the cannon with the help of "marines", most of whom are played by young women in sailors' outfits. The Man in the Moon watches the capsule as it approaches, and, in an iconic shot, it hits him in the eye. (Note: The image is a visual pun: the phrase dans l'œil, literally "in the eye," is the French equivalent of the English word "bullseye".)

Landing safely on the Moon, the astronomers get out of the capsule (without the need for space suits or breathing apparatus) and watch the Earth rise in the distance. Exhausted by their journey, they unroll their blankets and sleep. As they sleep, a comet passes, the Big Dipper appears with human faces peering out of each star, old Saturn leans out of a window in his ringed planet, and Phoebe, goddess of the Moon, appears seated in a crescent-moon swing. Phoebe causes a snowfall that awakens the astronomers, and they seek shelter in a cavern where they discover giant mushrooms. One astronomer opens his umbrella; it promptly takes root and turns into a giant mushroom itself.

At this point, a Selenite (an insectoid alien inhabitant of the Moon, named after one of the Greek moon goddesses, Selene) appears, but it is killed easily by an astronomer, as the creatures explode if they are hit with force. More Selenites appear, and it becomes increasingly difficult for the astronomers to destroy them as they are surrounded. The Selenites capture the astronomers and take them to the palace of their king. An astronomer lifts the Selenite King off his throne and throws him to the ground, causing him to explode.

The astronomers run back to their capsule while continuing to hit the pursuing Selenites, and five get inside. The sixth astronomer, Barbenfouillis himself, uses a rope to tip the capsule over a ledge on the Moon and into space. A Selenite tries to seize the capsule at the last minute. Astronomer, capsule, and Selenite fall through space and land in an ocean on Earth, where they are rescued by a ship and towed ashore. The final sequence (missing from some prints of the film) depicts a celebratory parade in honour of the travellers' return, including a display of the captive Selenite and the unveiling of a commemorative statue bearing the motto "Labor omnia vincit". (Note: "Labor omnia vincit" is Latin for "work conquers all".)

== Cast ==
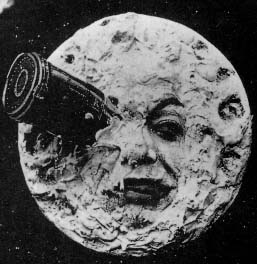
The landing on the eye of the Moon, the film's most iconic scene

When A Trip to the Moon was made, film actors performed anonymously, and no credits were given; the practice of supplying opening and closing credits in films was a later innovation. The following cast details can be reconstructed from available evidence:

- Georges Méliès as Professor Barbenfouillis and The Moon. Méliès, a pioneering French film-maker and magician now generally regarded as one of the first people to recognise the potential of narrative film, had already achieved considerable success with his film versions of Cinderella (1899) and Joan of Arc (1900). His extensive involvement in all of his films as director, producer, writer, designer, technician, publicist, editor, and often actor makes him one of the first cinematic auteurs. Speaking about his work late in life, Méliès commented: "The greatest difficulty in realising my own ideas forced me to sometimes play the leading role in my films ... I was a star without knowing I was one, since the term did not yet exist." All told, Méliès took an acting role in at least 300 of his 520 films.
- Bleuette Bernon as Phoebe (the woman on the crescent moon). Méliès discovered Bernon in the 1890s, when she was performing as a singer at the cabaret L'Enfer. She also appeared in his 1899 adaptation of Cinderella.
- François Lallement as the officer of the marines. Lallement was one of the salaried camera operators for the Star Film Company.
- Henri Delannoy as the captain of the rocket.
- Jules-Eugène Legris as the parade leader. Legris was a magician who performed at Méliès's theatre of stage illusions, the Théâtre Robert-Houdin in Paris.
- Victor André, Delpierre, Farjaux, Kelm, and Brunnet as the astronomers. André worked at the Théâtre de Cluny; the others were singers in French music halls.
- Ballet of the Théâtre du Châtelet as stars and as cannon attendants.
- Acrobats of the Folies Bergère as Selenites.

== Production ==
=== Inspiration ===
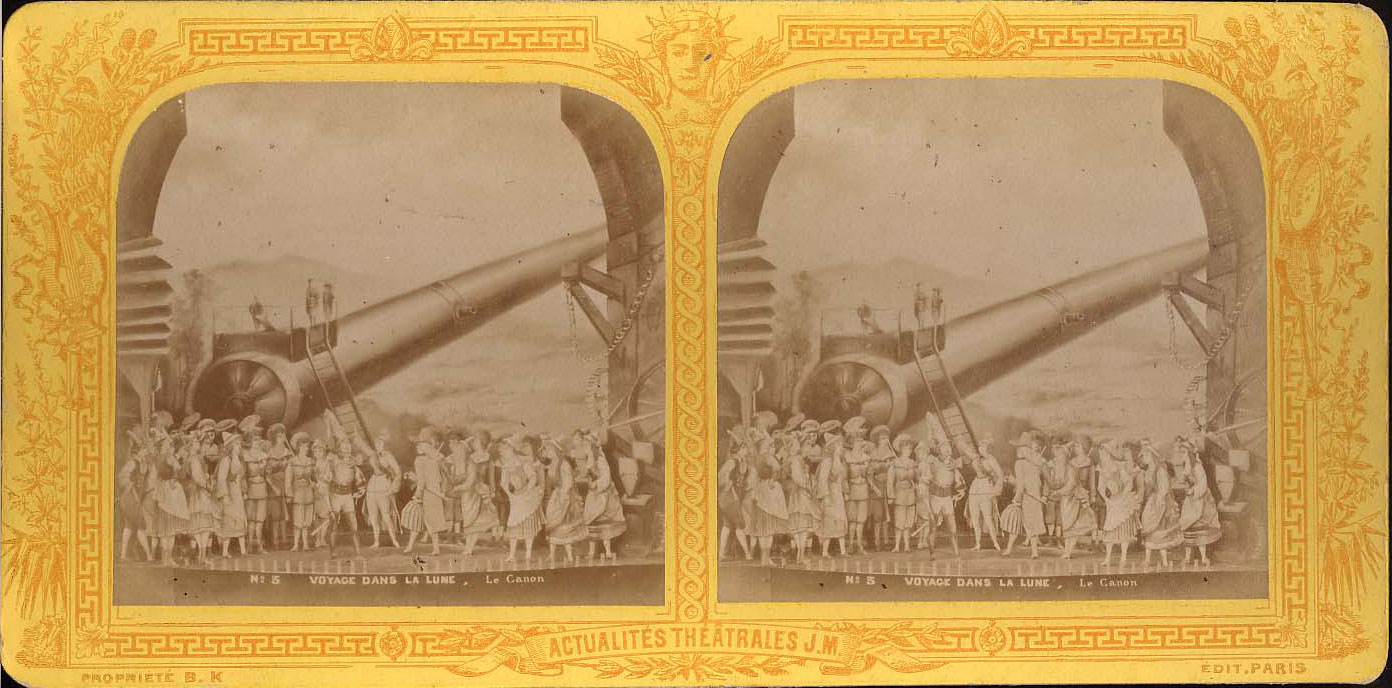
Stereoscope card showing a scene from Jacques Offenbach's Le voyage dans la lune.

When asked in 1930 what inspired him for A Trip to the Moon, Méliès credited Jules Verne's novels From the Earth to the Moon (1865) and Around the Moon (1870). Cinema historians, the mid-20th-century French writer Georges Sadoul first among them, have frequently suggested H. G. Wells's The First Men in the Moon (1901), a French translation of which was published a few months before Méliès made the film, as another likely influence. Sadoul argued that the first half of the film (up to the shooting of the projectile) is derived from Verne and that the second half, the travellers' adventures on and in the Moon, is derived from Wells.

In addition to these literary sources, various film scholars have suggested that Méliès was heavily influenced by other works, especially Jacques Offenbach's opera-féerie Le voyage dans la lune (an unauthorised parody of Verne's novels) and the A Trip to the Moon attraction at the 1901 Pan-American Exposition in Buffalo, New York. The French film historian Thierry Lefebvre hypothesises that Méliès drew upon both of these works, but in different ways: he appears to have taken the structure of the film—"a trip to the Moon, a Moon landing, an encounter with extraterrestrials with a deformity, an underground trek, an interview with the Man in the Moon, and a brutal return to reality back on Earth"—directly from the 1901 attraction, but also incorporated many plot elements (including the presence of six astronomers with pseudo-scientific names, telescopes that transform into stools, a moonshot cannon mounted above ground, a scene in which the Moon appears to approach the viewer, a lunar snowstorm, an earthrise scene, and umbrella-wielding travellers), not to mention the parodic tone of the film, from the Offenbach opera-féerie.

=== Filming ===
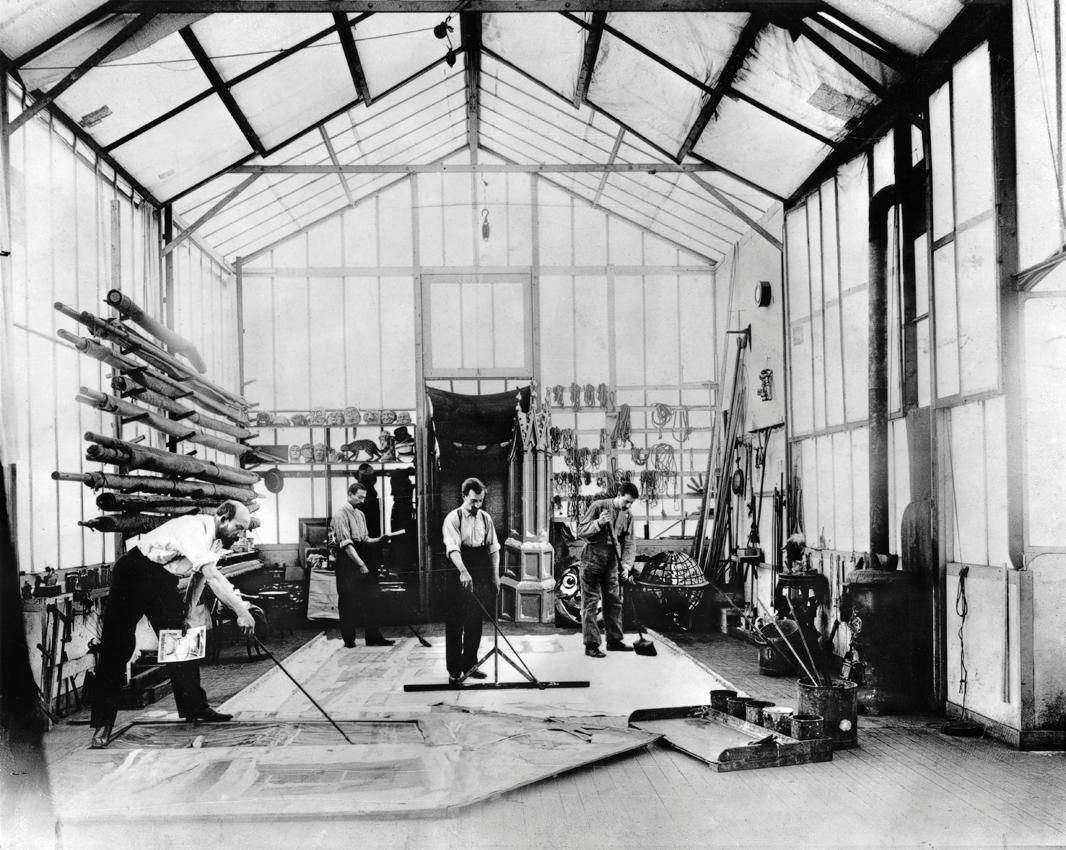
Méliès (at left) in the studio where A Trip to the Moon was filmed.

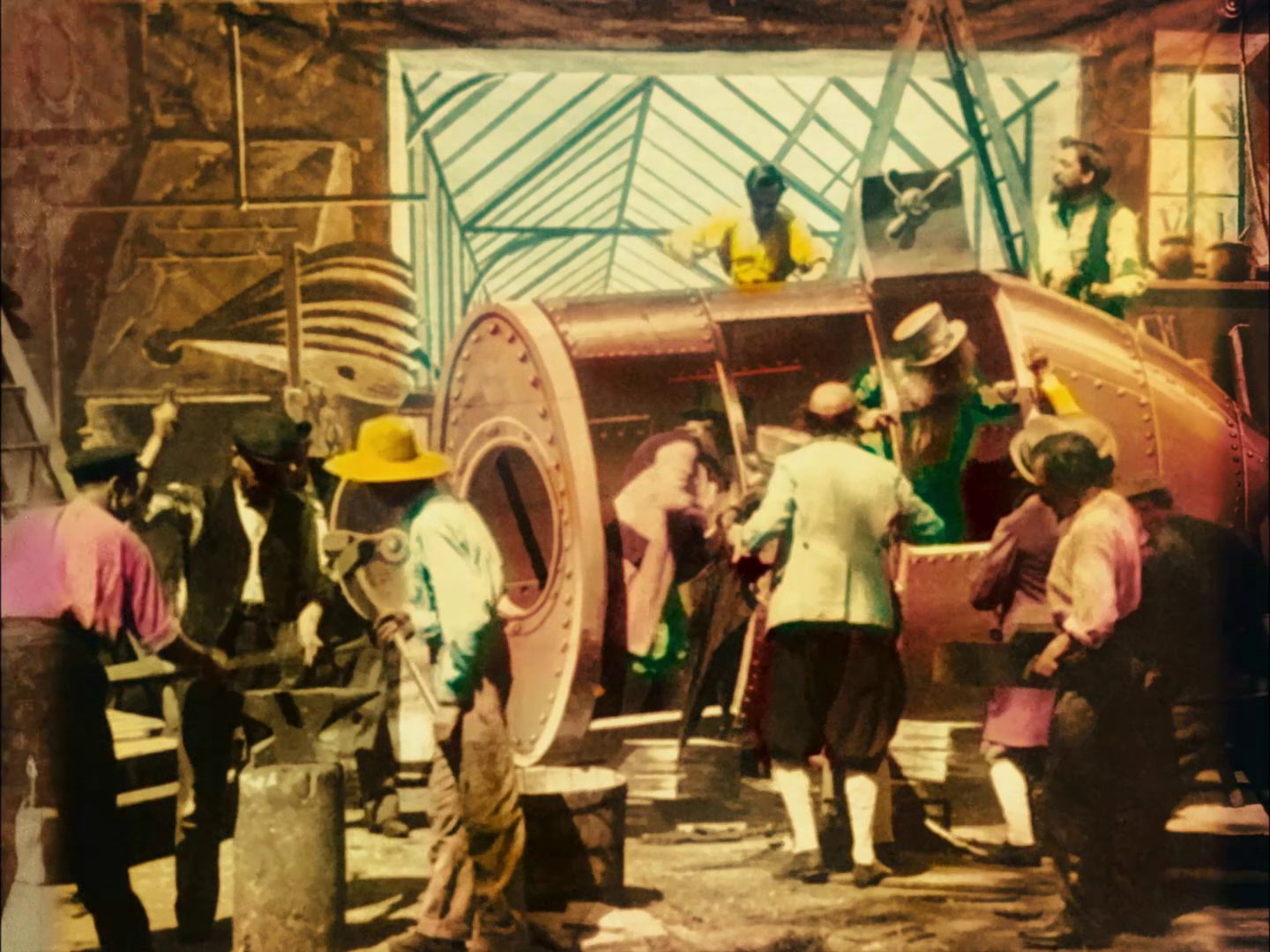
The workshop set includes a glass roof, evoking the actual studio.

As the science writer Ron Miller notes, A Trip to the Moon was one of the most complex films that Méliès had made, and employed "every trick he had learned or invented". It was his longest film yet; (Note: The film's total length is about 260 metres (roughly 845 feet) of film, which, at Méliès's preferred projection speed of 12 to 14 frames per second, is about 17 minutes. Films made in the same era by Méliès's contemporaries, the Edison Manufacturing Company and the Lumière Brothers, were on average about one third this length. Méliès went on to make longer films; his longest, The Conquest of the Pole, runs to 650 metres or about 44 minutes.) both the budget and filming duration were unusually lavish, costing ₣10,000 to make and taking three months to complete. The camera operators were Théophile Michault and Lucien Tainguy, who worked on a daily basis with Méliès as salaried employees for the Star Film Company. In addition to their work as cameramen, Méliès's operators also did odd jobs for the company such as developing film and helping to set up scenery, and another salaried operator, François Lallement, appeared onscreen as the marine officer. By contrast, Méliès hired his actors on a film-by-film basis, drawing from talented individuals in the Parisian theatrical world, with which he had many connections. They were paid one Louis d'or per day, a considerably higher salary than that offered by competitors, and had a full free meal at noon with Méliès.

Méliès's film studio, which he had built in Montreuil, Seine-Saint-Denis in 1897, was a greenhouse-like building with glass walls and a glass ceiling to let in as much sunlight as possible, a concept used by most still photography studios from the 1860s onward; it was built with the same dimensions as Méliès's own Théâtre Robert-Houdin (13.5 × 6.6 m). Throughout his film career, Méliès worked on a strict schedule of planning films in the morning, filming scenes during the brightest hours of the day, tending to the film laboratory and the Théâtre Robert-Houdin in the late afternoon, and attending performances at Parisian theatres in the evening.

According to Méliès's recollections, much of the unusual cost of A Trip to the Moon was due to the mechanically operated scenery and the Selenite costumes in particular, which were made for the film using cardboard and canvas. Méliès himself sculpted prototypes for the heads, feet, and kneecap pieces in terracotta, and then created plaster moulds for them. A mask-making specialist, probably from the major Parisian mask- and box-making firm of the Maison Hallé, used these moulds to produce cardboard versions for the actors to wear. Though other details about the film's making are scarce, the film historian Georges Sadoul argued that Méliès most likely collaborated with the painter Claudel on the scenery, and with Jehanne d'Alcy on the costumes. One of the backdrops for the film, showing the inside of the glass-roofed workshop in which the space capsule is built, was painted to look like the actual glass-roofed studio in which the film was made.

Many of the special effects in A Trip to the Moon, as in numerous other Méliès films, were created using the substitution splice technique, in which the camera operator stopped filming long enough for something onscreen to be altered, added, or taken away. Méliès carefully spliced the resulting shots together to create apparently magical effects, such as the transformation of the astronomers' telescopes into stools or the disappearance of the exploding Selenites in puffs of smoke. Other effects were created using theatrical means, such as stage machinery and pyrotechnics. The film also features transitional dissolves.

The pseudo-tracking shot in which the camera appears to approach the Man in the Moon was accomplished using an effect Méliès had invented the previous year for the film The Man with the Rubber Head. Rather than attempting to move his weighty camera toward an actor, he set a pulley-operated chair upon a rail-fitted ramp, placed the actor (covered up to the neck in black velvet) on the chair, and pulled him toward the camera. In addition to its technical practicality, this technique also allowed Méliès to control the placement of the face within the frame to a much greater degree of specificity than moving his camera allowed. A substitution splice allowed a model capsule to suddenly appear in the eye of the actor playing the Moon, completing the shot. Another notable sequence in the film, the plunge of the capsule into real ocean waves filmed on location, was created through multiple exposure, with a shot of the capsule falling in front of a black background superimposed upon the footage of the ocean. The shot is followed by an underwater glimpse of the capsule floating back to the surface, created by combining a moving cardboard cutout of the capsule with an aquarium containing tadpoles and air jets. The descent of the capsule from the Moon was covered in four shots, taking up about twenty seconds of film time.

=== Colouring ===
Colour prints were produced for a small percentage of Méliès's films and advertised alongside the black-and-white versions at a higher price. From approximately 1897 to 1912, these prints (for films such as The Kingdom of the Fairies, The Impossible Voyage, The Barber of Seville, and A Trip to the Moon) were hand-coloured by Élisabeth and Berthe Thuillier's colouring lab in Paris. The Thuilliers led a studio of two hundred women, painting directly on film stock with brushes in carefully chosen colours. Each worker was assigned a specific colour to apply to a frame of film in assembly line style, with more than twenty colours sometimes used for a single film. On average, the Thuilliers' lab produced about sixty hand-coloured copies of a film.

=== Music ===
Although Méliès's films were silent, they were not intended to be seen silently; exhibitors often used a bonimenteur, or narrator, to explain the story as it unfolded on the screen, accompanied by sound effects and live music. Méliès himself took considerable interest in musical accompaniment for his films, and prepared special film scores for several of them, including The Kingdom of the Fairies and The Barber of Seville. He did not require specific music for any film, allowing exhibitors freedom to choose whatever accompaniment they felt most suitable. When the film was screened at the Olympia music hall in Paris in 1902, an original film score was reportedly written for it.

In 1903, the English composer Ezra Read published a piano piece called A Trip to the Moon: Comic Descriptive Fantasia, which follows Méliès's film scene by scene and may have been used as a score for the film; it may have been commissioned by Méliès himself, who had likely met Read on one of his trips to England. More recent composers who have recorded scores for A Trip to the Moon include Nicolas Godin and Jean-Benoit Dunckel of Air (for the 2011 restoration; see the Hand-coloured version section below), Frederick Hodges, Robert Israel, Eric Le Guen, Lawrence Lehérissey (a great-great-grandson of Méliès), Jeff Mills, Donald Sosin, and Victor Young (for an abridged print featured as a prologue to the 1956 film Around the World in 80 Days).

== Style ==
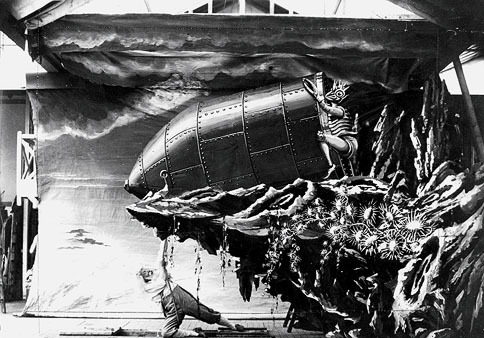
Uncropped production still from the film, showing the edges of the backdrop and the floor of the studio

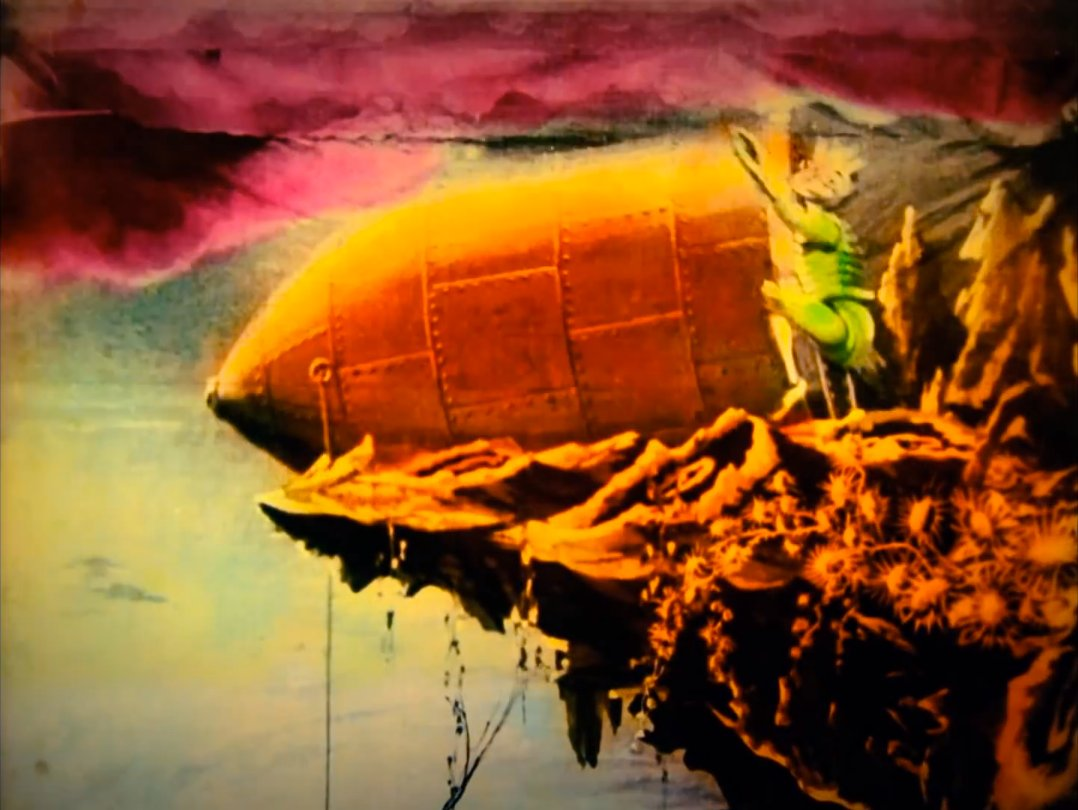
The scene as it appears in the hand-coloured print of the film

The film's style, like that of most of Méliès's other films, is deliberately theatrical. The stage set is highly stylised, recalling the traditions of the 19th-century stage, and is filmed by a stationary camera, placed to evoke the perspective of an audience member sitting in a theatre. (Note: The stationary position of the camera, which became known as one of Méliès's characteristic trademarks, was one of the most important elements of the style. Though he often moved his camera when making actualities outdoors (for example, 15 of his 19 short films about the 1900 Paris Exposition were shot with a moving camera setup), he considered a theatrical viewpoint more appropriate for the fiction films staged in his studio.) This stylistic choice was one of Méliès's first and biggest innovations.

Although he had initially followed the popular trend of the time by making mainly actuality films (short "slice of life" documentary films capturing actual scenes and events for the camera), in his first few years of filming Méliès gradually moved into the far less common genre of fictional narrative films, which he called his scènes composées or "artificially arranged scenes". The new genre was extensively influenced by Méliès's experience in theatre and magic, especially his familiarity with the popular French féerie stage tradition, known for their fantasy plots and spectacular visuals, including lavish scenery and mechanically worked stage effects. In an advertisement he proudly described the difference between his innovative films and the actualities still being made by his contemporaries: "these fantastic and artistic films reproduce stage scenes and create a new genre entirely different from the ordinary cinematographic views of real people and real streets."

Because A Trip to the Moon preceded the development of narrative film editing by filmmakers such as Edwin S. Porter and D. W. Griffith, it does not use the cinematic vocabulary to which American and European audiences later became accustomed, a vocabulary built on the purposeful use of techniques such as varied camera angles, intercutting, juxtapositions of shots, and other filmic ideas. Rather, each camera setup in Méliès's film is designed as a distinct dramatic scene uninterrupted by visible editing, an approach fitting the theatrical style in which the film was designed. (Note: The specification of visible editing is necessary because, in reality, Méliès used much splicing and editing within his scenes, not only for stop-trick effects but also to break down his long scenes into smaller takes during production. Thus, A Trip to the Moon actually contains more than fifty shots. All such editing was deliberately designed to be unnoticeable by the viewer; the camera angle remained the same, and action continued fluidly through the splice by means of careful shot-matching.)

Similarly, film scholars have noted that the most famous moment in A Trip to the Moon plays with temporal continuity by showing an event twice: first the capsule is shown suddenly appearing in the eye of an anthropomorphic moon; then, in a much closer shot, the landing occurs very differently, and much more realistically, with the capsule actually plummeting into believable lunar terrain. This kind of nonlinear storytelling—in which time and space are treated as repeatable and flexible rather than linear and causal—is highly unconventional by the standards of Griffith and his followers, before the development of continuity editing. Other filmmakers performed similar experiments with time. (Porter, for instance, used temporal discontinuity and repetition extensively in his 1903 film Life of an American Fireman.) Later in the 20th century, with sports television's development of the instant replay, temporal repetition again became a familiar device to screen audiences.

Because Méliès does not use a modern cinematic vocabulary, some film scholars have created other frameworks of thought with which to assess his films. For example, some recent academicians, while not necessarily denying Méliès's influence on film, have argued that his works are better understood as spectacular theatrical creations rooted in the 19th-century stage tradition of the féerie.

Similarly, Tom Gunning has argued that to fault Méliès for not inventing a more intimate and cinematic storytelling style is to misunderstand the purpose of his films; in Gunning's view, the first decade of film history may be considered a "cinema of attractions," in which filmmakers experimented with a presentational style based on spectacle and direct address rather than on intricate editing. Though the attraction style of filmmaking declined in popularity in favour of a more integrated "story film" approach, it remains an important component of certain types of cinema, including science fiction films, musicals, and avant-garde films.

== Themes ==
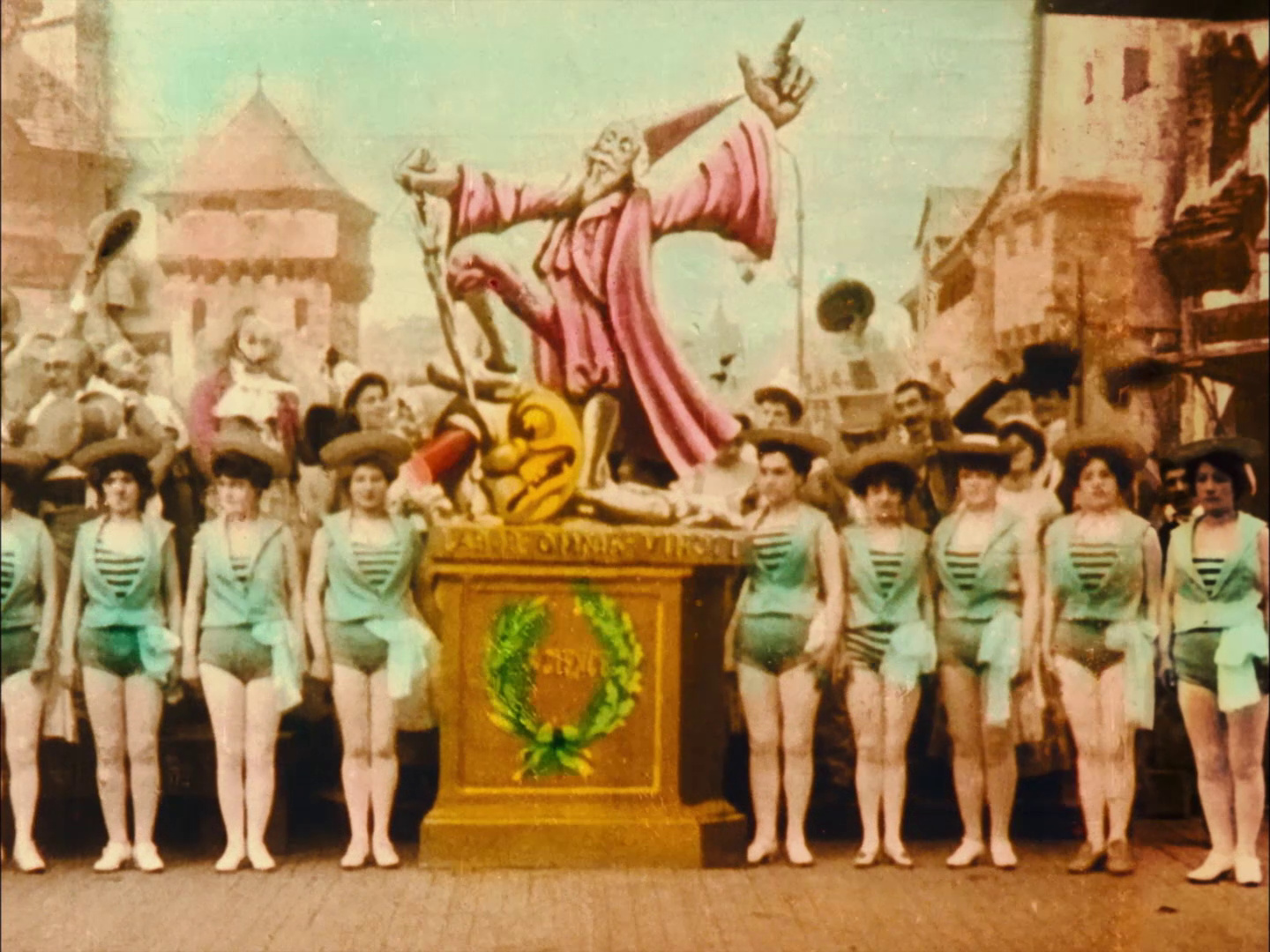
The statue of Barbenfouillis, seen here in a frame from the hand-coloured print, may be intended to satirise colonialism.

With its pioneering use of themes of scientific ambition and discovery, A Trip to the Moon is sometimes described as the first science fiction film. (Note: Méliès's earlier film Gugusse and the Automaton has also been nominated as the first science fiction film.) A Short History of Film argues that it codified "many of the basic generic situations that are still used in science fiction films today". Other genre designations are possible; Méliès advertised the film as a pièce à grand spectacle, a term referring to a type of spectacular Parisian stage extravaganza popularised by Jules Verne and Adolphe d'Ennery in the second half of the 19th century. Richard Abel describes the film as belonging to the féerie genre, as does Frank Kessler. It can also be described simply as a trick film, a catch-all term for the popular early film genre of innovative, special effects-filled shorts—a genre Méliès himself had codified and popularised in his earlier works.

A Trip to the Moon is highly satirical in tone, poking fun at 19th-century science by exaggerating it in the format of an adventure story. The film makes no pretense whatsoever to be scientifically plausible; the real waves in the splashdown scene are the only concession to realism. The film scholar Alison McMahan calls A Trip to the Moon one of the earliest examples of 'pataphysical film, saying it "aims to show the illogicality of logical thinking" with its satirically portrayed inept scientists, anthropomorphic moon face, and impossible transgressions of laws of physics. The film historian Richard Abel believes Méliès aimed in the film to "invert the hierarchal values of modern French society and hold them up to ridicule in a riot of the carnivalesque". Similarly, the literary and film scholar Edward Wagenknecht described the film as a work "satirizing the pretensions of professors and scientific societies while simultaneously appealing to man's sense of wonder in the face of an unexplored universe."

The film's satire also has a strong anti-imperialist vein. The film scholar Matthew Solomon notes that the last part of the film (the parade and commemoration sequence missing in some prints) is especially forceful in this regard. He argues that Méliès, who had previously worked as an anti-Boulangist political cartoonist, mocks imperialistic domination in the film by presenting his colonial conquerors as bumbling pedants who mercilessly attack the alien lifeforms they meet and return with a mistreated captive amid fanfares of self-congratulation. The statue of Barbenfouillis shown in the film's final shot even resembles the pompous, bullying colonialists in Méliès's political cartoons. The film scholar Elizabeth Ezra agrees that "Méliès mocks the pretensions of colonialist accounts of the conquest of one culture by another," and adds that "his film also thematizes social differentiation on the home front, as the hierarchical patterns on the moon are shown to bear a curious resemblance to those on earth."

== Release ==
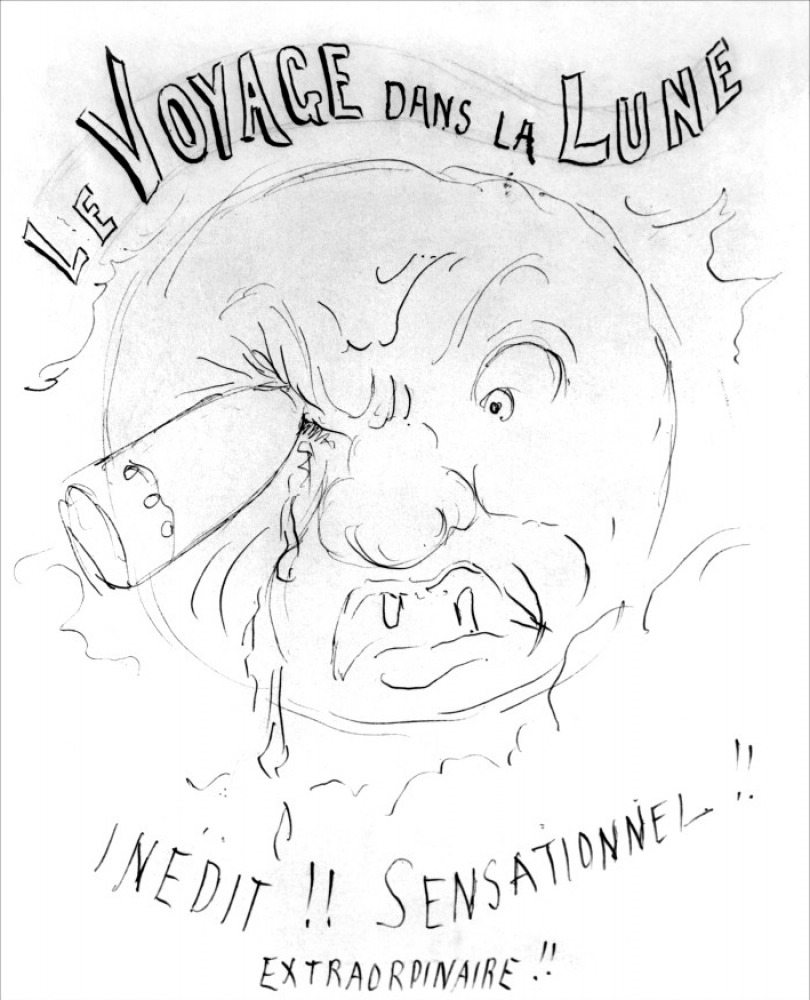
Preliminary sketch by Méliès for a poster of the film.

Méliès, who had begun A Trip to the Moon in May 1902, finished the film in August of that year and began selling prints to French distributors in the same month. From September through December 1902, a hand-coloured print of A Trip to the Moon was screened at Méliès's Théâtre Robert-Houdin in Paris. The film was shown after Saturday and Thursday matinee performances by Méliès's colleague and fellow magician, Jules-Eugène Legris, who appeared as the leader of the parade in the two final scenes. Méliès sold black-and-white and colour prints of the film through his Star Film Company, where the film was assigned the catalogue number 399–411 (Note: In Méliès's numbering system, films were listed and numbered according to their order of production, and each catalogue number denotes about 20 metres of film; thus A Trip to the Moon, at about 260 metres long, is listed as #399–411.) and given the descriptive subtitle Pièce à grand spectacle en 30 tableaux. (Note: The word tableau, used in French theatre to mean "scene" or "stage picture," refers in Méliès's catalogues to distinct episodes in the film, rather than changes of scene; thus, Méliès counted thirty tableaux within the scenes of A Trip to the Moon.) In France, black-and-white prints sold for ₣560, and hand-coloured prints for ₣1,000. Méliès also sold the film indirectly through Charles Urban's Warwick Trading Company in London.

Many circumstances surrounding the film—including its unusual budget, length, and production time, as well as its similarities to the 1901 New York attraction—indicate that Méliès was especially keen to release the film in the United States. (Note: The historian Richard Abel notes that stories involving trips to the moon, whether in print, on stage, or as themed attractions, were highly popular in America at the time; indeed, a previous film of Méliès's, The Astronomer's Dream, was often shown in the United States under the title "A Trip to the Moon".) Because of rampant film piracy, Méliès never received most of the profits of the popular film. One account reports that Méliès sold a print of the film to the Paris photographer Charles Gerschel for use in an Algiers theatre, under strict stipulation that the print only be shown in Algeria. Gerschel sold the print, and various other Méliès films, to the Edison Manufacturing Company employee Alfred C. Abadie, who sent them directly to Edison's laboratories to be duplicated and sold by Vitagraph. Copies of the print spread to other firms, and by 1904 Siegmund Lubin, the Selig Polyscope Company, and Edison were all redistributing it. Edison's print of the film was even offered in a hand-coloured version available at a higher price, just as Méliès had done. Méliès was often uncredited altogether; for the first six months of the film's distribution, the only American exhibitor to credit Méliès in advertisements for the film was Thomas Lincoln Tally, who chose the film as the inaugural presentation of his Electric Theatre.

To combat the problem of film piracy that became clear during the release of A Trip to the Moon, Méliès opened an American branch of the Star Film Company, directed by his brother Gaston Méliès, in New York in 1903. The office was designed to sell Méliès's films directly and to protect them by registering them under United States copyright. The introduction to the English-language edition of the Star Film Company catalogue announced: "In opening a factory and office in New York we are prepared and determined energetically to pursue all counterfeiters and pirates. We will not speak twice, we will act!"

Various trade arrangements were made with other film companies, including American Mutoscope and Biograph, the Warwick Trading Company, the Charles Urban Trading Co., Robert W. Paul's studio, and Gaumont. In these negotiations, a print sale price of US$0.15 per foot was standardised across the American market, which proved useful to Méliès. Later price standardisations by the Motion Picture Patents Company in 1908 hastened his financial ruin, as his films were impractically expensive under the new standards. After 1908, his films waned from the fashions of the time as fanciful magic fell out of vogue.

== Reception ==
According to Méliès's memoirs, his initial attempts to sell A Trip to the Moon to French fairground exhibitors met with failure because of the film's unusually high price. Finally, Méliès offered to let one such exhibitor borrow a print of the film to screen for free. The applause from the very first showing was so enthusiastic that fairgoers kept the theatre packed until midnight. The exhibitor bought the film immediately, and when he was reminded of his initial reluctance he even offered to add ₣200 to compensate "for [Méliès's] inconvenience." The film was a pronounced success in France, running uninterrupted at the Olympia music hall in Paris for several months.

A Trip to the Moon was met with especially large enthusiasm in the United States, where (to Méliès's chagrin) its piracy by Lubin, Selig, Edison and others gave it wide distribution. Exhibitors in New York City, Washington, D.C., Cleveland, Detroit, New Orleans, and Kansas City reported on the film's great success in their theatres. The film also did well in other countries, including Germany, Canada, and Italy, where it was featured as a headline attraction through 1904.

A Trip to the Moon was one of the most popular films of the first few years of the 20th century, rivalled only by a small handful of others (similarly spectacular Méliès films such as The Kingdom of the Fairies and The Impossible Voyage among them). Late in life, Méliès remarked that A Trip to the Moon was "surely not one of my best," but acknowledged that it was widely considered his masterpiece and that "it left an indelible trace because it was the first of its kind." The film which Méliès was proudest of was Humanity Through the Ages (1908), a serious historical drama now presumed lost.

The film has a fresh score of 100% on Rotten Tomatoes from 14 critic reviews.

In July 2019, the film was ranked 1st in a Rotten Tomatoes list of "38 Moon Movies to Celebrate the Moon Landing".

== Rediscovery ==
=== Black-and-white print ===
After Méliès's financial difficulties and decline, most copies of his prints were lost. In 1917, his offices were occupied by the French military, who melted down many of Méliès's films to gather the traces of silver from the film stock and make boot heels from the celluloid. When the Théâtre Robert-Houdin was demolished in 1923, the prints kept there were sold by weight to a vendor of second-hand film. Finally, in that same year, Méliès had a sudden fit of rage and burned all his remaining negatives in his garden in Montreuil. In 1925, he began selling toys and candy from a stand in the Gare Montparnasse in Paris. A Trip to the Moon was largely forgotten to history and went unseen for years.

Thanks to the efforts of film history devotées, especially René Clair, Jean George Auriol, and Paul Gilson, Méliès and his work were rediscovered in the late 1920s. A "Gala Méliès" was held at the Salle Pleyel in Paris on 16 December 1929 in celebration of the filmmaker, and he was awarded the Legion of Honor in 1931. During this renaissance of interest in Méliès, the cinema manager Jean Mauclaire and the early film experimenter Jean Acme LeRoy both set out independently to locate a surviving print of A Trip to the Moon. Mauclaire obtained a copy from Paris in October 1929, and LeRoy found one from London in 1930, though both prints were incomplete; Mauclaire's lacked the first scene, and LeRoy's was missing the entire final sequence featuring the parade and commemorative statue. These prints were occasionally screened at retrospectives (including the Gala Méliès), avant-garde cinema showings, and other special occasions, sometimes in presentations by Méliès himself.

Following LeRoy's death in 1932, his film collection was bought by the Museum of Modern Art in 1936. The museum's acquisition and subsequent screenings of A Trip to the Moon, under the direction of MoMA's film curator Iris Barry, opened the film up once again to a wide audience of Americans and Canadians and established it definitively as a landmark in the history of cinema. LeRoy's incomplete print became the most commonly seen version of the film and the source print for most other copies, including the Cinémathèque Française's print. A complete version of the film, including the entire celebration sequence, was finally reconstructed in 1997 from various sources by the Cinémathèque Méliès, a foundation set up by the Méliès family.

=== Hand-coloured print ===
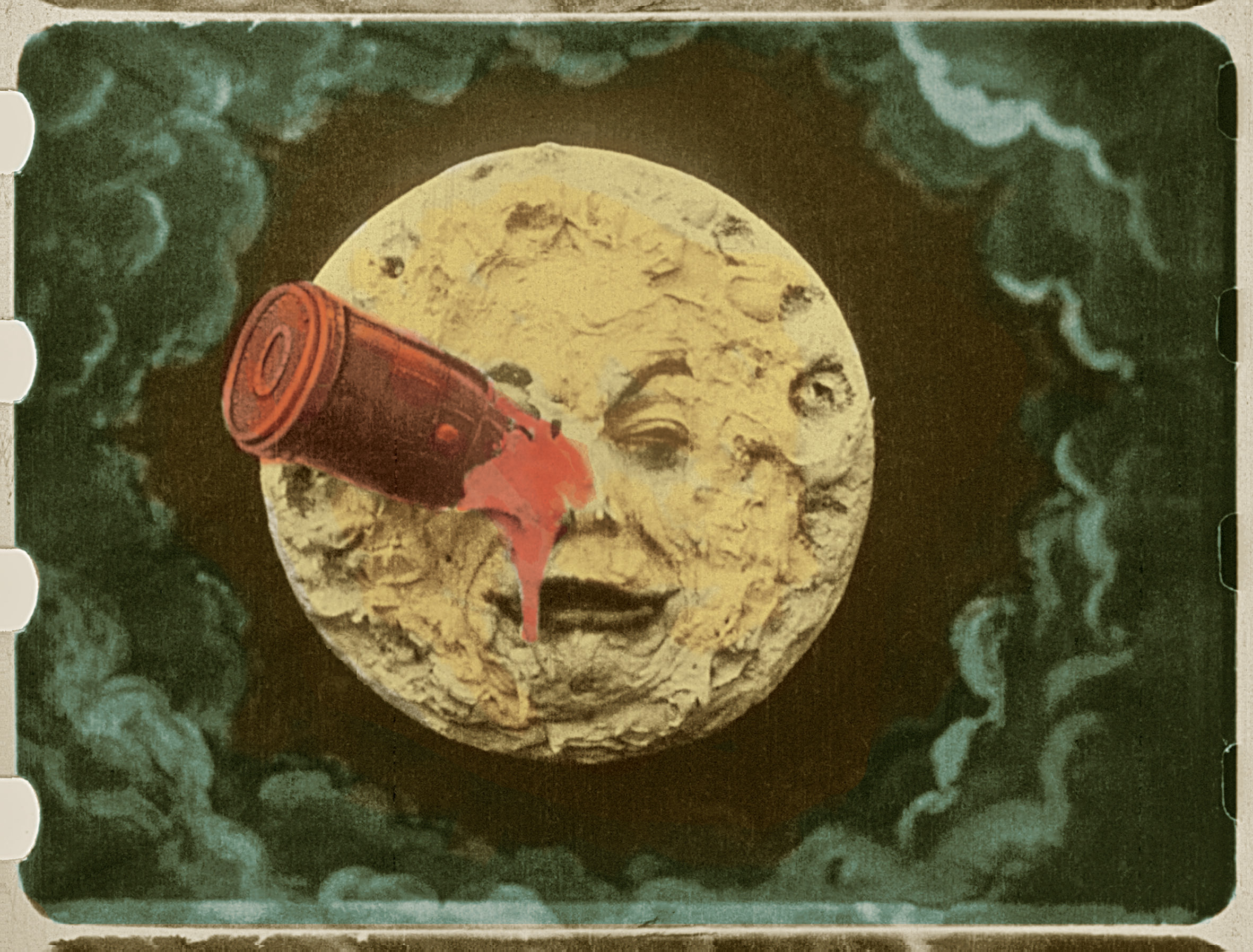
A frame from the restored hand-coloured print of A Trip to the Moon

No hand-coloured prints of A Trip to the Moon were known to have survived, until 1993, when one was given to the Filmoteca de Catalunya by an anonymous donor as part of a collection of two hundred silent films. It is unknown whether this version, a hand-coloured print struck from a second-generation negative, was coloured by Elisabeth Thuillier's lab, but the perforations used imply that the copy was made before 1906. The flag waved during the launching scene in this copy is coloured to resemble the flag of Spain, indicating that the hand-coloured copy was made for a Spanish exhibitor.

In 1999, Anton Gimenez of the Filmoteca de Catalunya mentioned the existence of this print, which he believed to be in a state of total decomposition, to Serge Bromberg and Eric Lange of the French film company Lobster Films. Bromberg and Lange offered to trade a recently rediscovered film by Segundo de Chomón for the hand-coloured print, and Gimenez accepted. Bromberg and Lange consulted various specialist laboratories in an attempt to restore the film, but because the reel of film had apparently decomposed into a rigid mass, none believed restoration to be possible. Consequently, Bromberg and Lange themselves set to work separating the film frames, discovering that only the edges of the film stock had decomposed and congealed together, and thus that many of the frames themselves were still salvageable. Between 2002 and 2005, various digitisation efforts allowed 13,375 fragments of images from the print to be saved. In 2010, a complete restoration of the hand-coloured print was launched by Lobster Films, the Groupama Gan Foundation for Cinema, and the Technicolor Foundation for Cinema Heritage. The digitised fragments of the hand-coloured print were reassembled and restored, with missing frames recreated with the help of a black-and-white print in the possession of the Méliès family, and time-converted to run at an authentic silent-film speed, 16 frames per second. The restoration was completed in 2011 at Technicolor's laboratories in Los Angeles. Restoration costs were $1 million.

The restored version premiered on 11 May 2011, eighteen years after its discovery and 109 years after its original release, at the 2011 Cannes Film Festival, with a new soundtrack by the French band Air. The restoration was released by Flicker Alley in a 2-disc Blu-ray and DVD edition featuring both colour and black & white versions of the film also including The Extraordinary Voyage, a feature-length documentary by Bromberg and Lange about the film's restoration, in 2012. In The New York Times, A. O. Scott called the restoration "surely a cinematic highlight of the year, maybe the century."

== Legacy ==
Segundo de Chomón's Excursion to the Moon, a remake of the film; runtime 00:06:46.(1908)

As A Short History of Film notes, A Trip to the Moon combined "spectacle, sensation, and technical wizardry to create a cosmic fantasy that was an international sensation." It was profoundly influential on later filmmakers, bringing creativity to the cinematic medium and offering fantasy for pure entertainment, a rare goal in film at the time. In addition, Méliès's innovative editing and special effects techniques were widely imitated and became important elements of the medium. The film also spurred on the development of cinematic science fiction and fantasy by demonstrating that scientific themes worked on the screen and that reality could be transformed by the camera. In a 1940 interview, Edwin S. Porter said that it was by seeing A Trip to the Moon and other Méliès films that he "came to the conclusion that a picture telling a story might draw the customers back to the theatres, and set to work in this direction." Similarly, D. W. Griffith said simply of Méliès: "I owe him everything." Since these American directors are widely credited with developing modern film narrative technique, the literary and film scholar Edward Wagenknecht once summed up Méliès's importance to film history by commenting that Méliès "profoundly influenced both Porter and Griffith and through them the whole course of American film-making."

It remains Méliès's most famous film, as well as a classic example of early cinema, with the image of the capsule stuck in the Man in the Moon's eye particularly well known. The film has been evoked in other creative works many times, ranging from Segundo de Chomón's 1908 unauthorised remake Excursion to the Moon through the extensive tribute to Méliès and the film in the Brian Selznick 2007 novel The Invention of Hugo Cabret and its 2011 Martin Scorsese film adaptation Hugo. Film scholar Andrew J. Rausch includes A Trip to the Moon among the "32 most pivotal moments in the history of [film]," saying it "changed the way movies were produced." Chiara Ferrari's essay on the film in 1001 Movies You Must See Before You Die, which places A Trip to the Moon as the first entry, argues that the film "directly reflects the histrionic personality of its director", and that the film "deserves a legitimate place among the milestones in world cinema history."

== See also ==
- 1902 in science fiction
- List of early color feature films
- List of films featuring extraterrestrials
- Tonight, Tonight (The Smashing Pumpkins song) § Music video
