= Arthur Heulhard =

French journalist and writer (1849–1920)

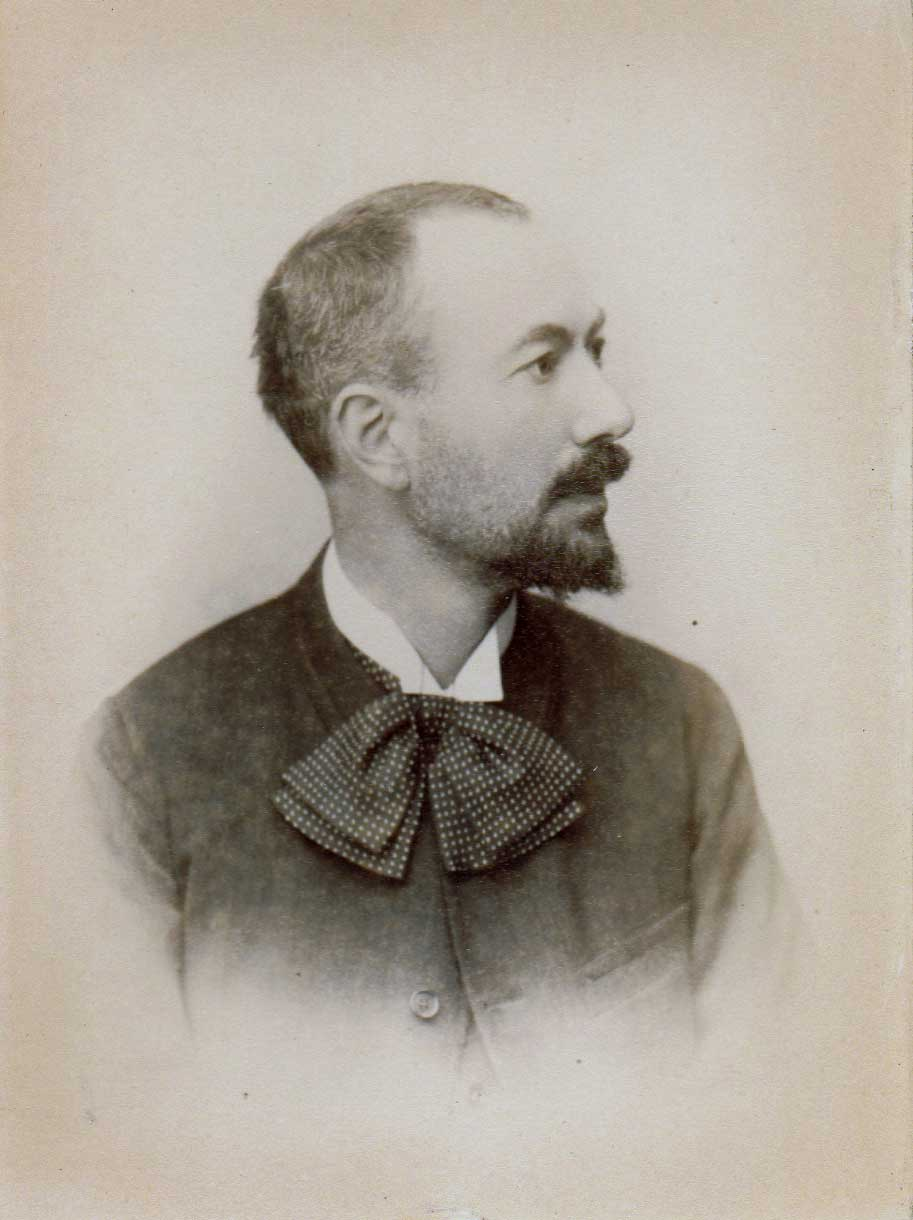
- Born: May 11, 1849; Lormes, France
- Died: January 2, 1920 (aged 70)

Arthur Heulhard (May 11, 1849 – January 2, 1920) was a French journalist and writer, best known as an advocate of the Christ myth theory.

Heulhard was born in Lormes. He was the author of Le Mensonge Chrétien, a series of eleven volumes declaring that Jesus had no historical existence. According to Heulhard, it was Barabbas who was crucifixed by Pontius Pilate and Christians actually worship Barabbas under the name Jesus, an imaginary person invented by the early Church. Heulhard gained a follower, the French scholar Daniel Massé who supported his thesis and authored a book on the subject.

Heulhard was a member of the Fourchette Harmonique Club of Bibliophiles and wrote for the L'Art musical and La France Chorale.

== Selected publications ==
- Le Mensonge Chrétien: Jésus-Christ n'a pas existé (11 volumes, 1908–1910)

Volume I: Le Charpentier.
Volume II: Le Roi des Juifs.
Volume III: Les marchands de Christ.
Volume IV: Le Saint-Esprit.
Volume V: Le Gogotha.
Volume VI: L'évangile de Nessus.
Volume VII: Les évangiles de Satan (Part 1).
Volume VIII: Les évangiles de Satan (Part 2).
Volume IX: Les évangiles de Satan (Part 3).
Volume X: Bar-Abbas.
Volume XI: Le Juif de rapport.

- Le Mensonge chrétien. La Vérité: Barabbas – Le Mensonge: Jésus (reduced edition in one volume, 1913)
