= Red Riding Hood (1901 film) =

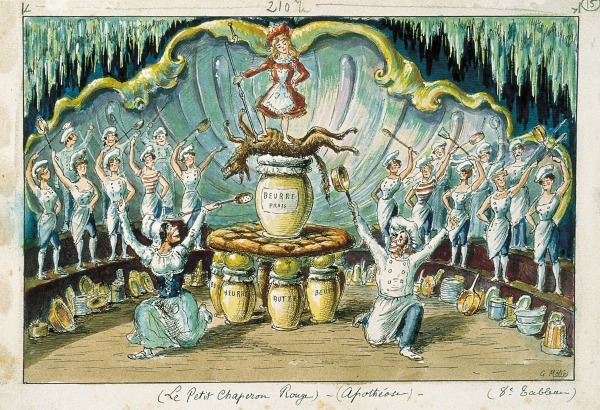
- Drawing by Méliès of the film's final scene
- Directed by: Georges Méliès
- Based on: "Little Red Riding Hood" by Charles Perrault
- Production company: Star Film Company
- Release date: 1901
- Running time: 160 meters
- Country: France
- Language: Silent

Red Riding Hood (French: Le Petit Chaperon rouge) is a 1901 French silent film by Georges Méliès, based on the folktale "Little Red Riding Hood". Méliès's adaptation expanded and altered the Charles Perrault version of the story to allow for additional comedy and detail, as well as a happier ending than Perrault provided. In the film, Red Riding Hood is a high-spirited, adventurous daughter in a family of bakers in the French countryside, nearly eaten by a wolf during her journey to take a galette to her grandmother. Red Riding Hood is rescued by the bakery staff just in time, the wolf meets his end during a dramatic chase, and all return home victorious.

The film was distributed internationally, including in its native France by Méliès's Star Film Company, in Britain by the Warwick Trading Company, and in the United States—without permission from or credit to Méliès—by the Edison Manufacturing Company. The film is presently presumed lost.

== Plot ==
In a bakery in the French countryside, Father Latourte, his wife, and their staff are busy with customers, pastries, and baked goods of all kinds. The Latourtes' young daughter, called Red Riding Hood, reads by the firelight until her parents leave for a moment. She starts to play boisterously, getting the bakery staff mixed up in hijinks and pratfalls. Her father and mother return, chagrined by her escapades, and she is told to take a pot of butter and a galette to her grandmother's cottage. Red Riding Hood travels through the forest on her errand, meeting a wolf, who finds out where she is going. Encountering her friends from the village school, she happily pauses her journey to play and dance with them. Meanwhile, at a windmill near the cottage, the miller Sans-Souci has comic trouble with his mule.

The wolf arrives at the cottage, has a spirited fight with the grandmother, swallows her, puts on her clothes, and waits in her bed. Red Riding Hood arrives, and in silent-film pantomime the famous dialogue ("Goodness, what big eyes you have!", "The better to see you with", etc.) takes place. The wolf is about to pounce on Red Riding Hood when the staff of the bakery, in search of the missing child, bursts into the cottage. Pandemonium breaks out as the wolf is chased all around the cottage and finally, with a shatter of glass, out a closed window. The bakers follow him through the forest, with country folk joining in the chase as it goes on. As the wolf crosses a bridge over a rocky gorge and a torrent, he is shot by a garde champêtre. The wolf has an over-the-top death scene, somersaulting and tumbling, until the bridge breaks and sends him into the torrent. The wolf's body is pulled out of the river and carried off on a stretcher.

In the village square, a fête is in progress. Red Riding Hood's rescue procession comes back just in time to watch the great parade of village worthies, peasants, and schoolchildren through the square. The wolf's body is ceremoniously put on a spit and roasted. A spectacular apotheosis shows Red Riding Hood, in the pose of Saint Michael Fighting the Dragon, skewering her enemy on a pedestal of enormous galettes and butter pots, surrounded by baking and cooking implements.

== Production and release ==
Méliès based Red Riding Hood on Charles Perrault's version of the story, expanding it with comedy and "picturesque episodes," and altering the plot to allow for a happy ending (in Perrault's telling, the heroine is eaten by the wolf). In the catalogue description of the film, Méliès emphasized the comic and "picturesque" (pittoresque) nature of the adaptation, highlighting an onscreen scene change from the outside to the inside of the grandmother's cottage as a "beautiful stage machinery effect" (joli effet de machinerie théâtrale).

The film was released by Méliès's Star Film Company and is numbered 337–344 in its catalogues, where it was advertised as a "spectacular féerie play in twelve tableaux" (pièce féerique à grand spectacle en 12 tableaux). The Warwick Trading Company handled distribution in Britain, where the film could be purchased either in black-and-white (for £18) or with hand colouring applied (for £36). To anglicize the film for British audiences, Warwick's publicity renamed Father Latourte to Mr Plumcake.

The Edison Manufacturing Company, taking advantage of what was then permissible under international copyright law, made its own prints of Méliès's film and sold them in the United States without Méliès's permission, claiming the film to be one of their productions.

Red Riding Hood is currently presumed lost.
