= The Impossible Voyage =

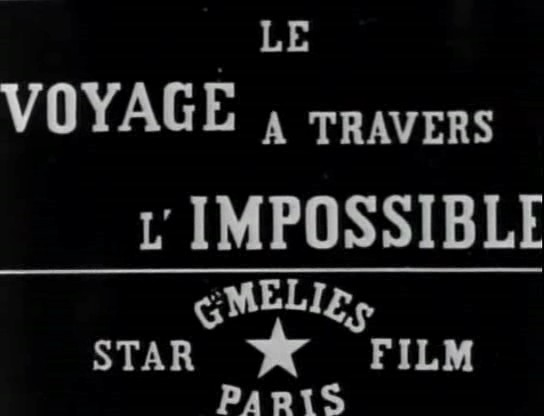
- Original title card
- Directed by: Georges Méliès
- Based on: Journey Through the Impossible by: Jules Verne; Adolphe d'Ennery
- Starring: Georges Méliès; Fernande Albany; Jehanne d'Alcy
- Production company: Star Film Company
- Release date: 1904
- Running time: 374 meters Approx. 20 minutes
- Country: France
- Language: Silent
- Budget: ₣37,500

The Impossible Voyage (French: Le Voyage à travers l'impossible), also known as An Impossible Voyage and Whirling the Worlds, is a 1904 French silent trick film directed by Georges Méliès. Inspired by Jules Verne's and Adolphe d'Ennery's 1882 play Journey Through the Impossible, and modeled in style and format on Méliès's highly successful 1902 film A Trip to the Moon, the film is a satire of scientific exploration in which a group of geographically minded tourists attempt a journey to the Sun using various methods of transportation. The film was a significant international success at the time of its release, and has been well received by film historians.

== Plot ==
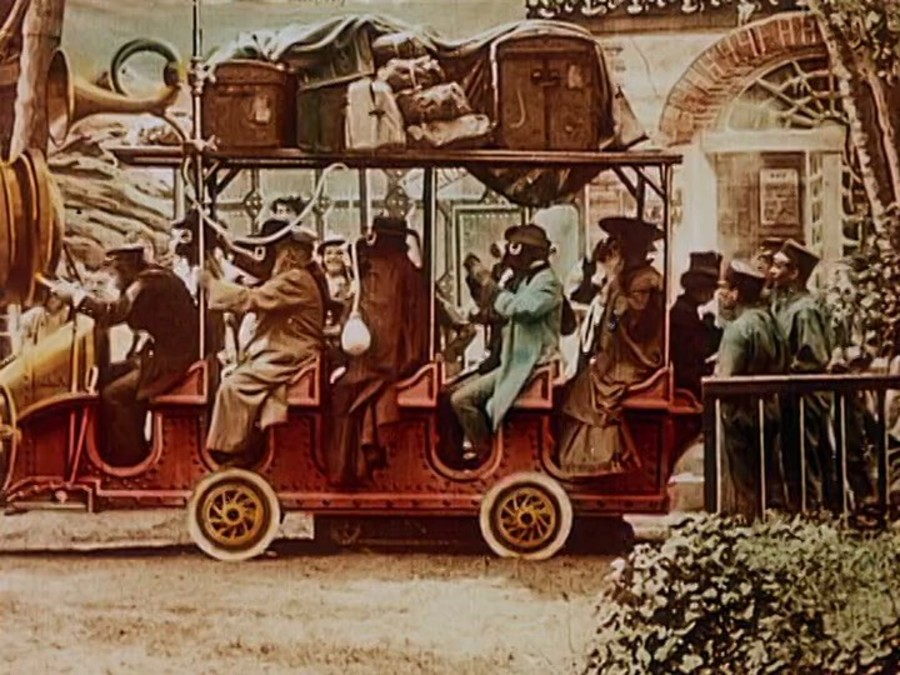
The travelers board the Auto-Crazyloff car

Note: Since the film is silent and has no intertitles, the proper names and quotations below are taken from the English-language description of the film published by Méliès in the catalog of the Star Film Company's New York Branch.

A society of geographical enthusiasts, the Institute of Incoherent Geography, plans to make a world tour in such a way as to "surpass in conception and invention all previous expeditions undertaken by the learned world." At a meeting headed by President Polehunter, "assisted by Secretary Rattlebrain, by the Archivist Mole, by the Vice-president Humbug, the members of the office, Easily-fooled, Daredevil, Schemer, etc., etc.", the sumptuously dressed ladies and gentlemen of the Institute listen to Professor Daredevil's plan for the world tour, but reject it for being out-of-date. The president then welcomes the eccentric engineer Crazyloff. He explains his project for a new "impossible" voyage, using "all the known means of locomotion—railroads, automobiles, dirigible balloons, submarine boats…" The unusual plan is accepted enthusiastically, and preparations begin.

When work is complete, the machines and travelers are loaded onto a train and are sent to the Swiss Alps, where the travelers will begin their journey. They first board a touring automobile, the Auto-Crazyloff, and journey through the mountains. In an attempt to run at high speed over the summit of the Rigi, the travelers crash at the bottom of a precipice. They are saved by mountaineers and rushed to a Swiss hospital, where they make gradual but chaotic recoveries.

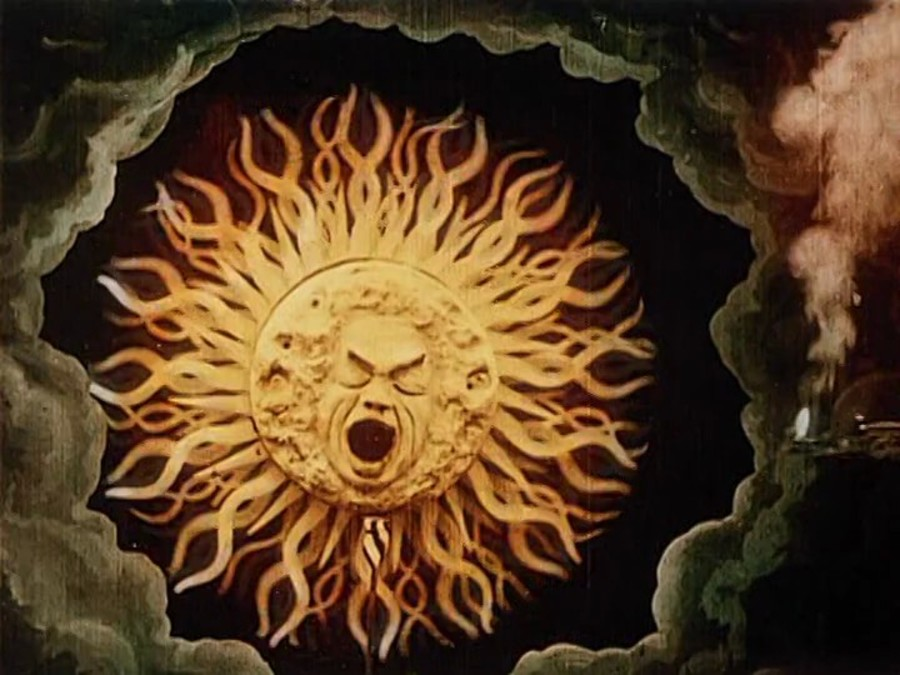
The expedition travels to the Sun

After they have finished recovering, the travelers board a train with their other vehicles attached to it, and make a second attempt at running over a summit: this time, the Jungfrau. Getting higher and higher every minute, with dirigible balloons tied to the train, they rise into space and are swallowed by the Sun. The travelers land with a crash on the Sun's surface. They are happy to be alive, but the heat is too much for them. Crazyloff directs the travelers to seek shelter in the train's gigantic icebox, but this plan goes too far in the other direction: moments later, the whole group has been frozen solid. Crazyloff finds a bundle of straw among the debris and starts a fire on the surface of the Sun to melt the ice. The travelers thaw out and are happily shepherded into the expedition's submarine. Crazyloff launches it off a cliff on the Sun, and it plummets through space to fall into an ocean on Earth.

After a few minutes of underwater sightseeing, a boiler problem causes the submarine to explode. The travelers are thrown up into the air, landing safely at a seaport amid the wreckage of the submarine. They return in triumph to the Institute of Incoherent Geography, where a grand rejoicing is held for them.

== Cast ==
- Georges Méliès as the engineer Crazyloff (in French, Mabouloff; "maboul" is French for "crazy" or "crackpot")
- Fernande Albany as Mrs. Polehunter, the institute president's wife (in French, Madame Latrouille, wife of President Latrouille; "avoir la trouille" is French for "to be scared or nervous"), one of the travelers
- May de Lavergne as a nurse in the Swiss hospital
- Jehanne d'Alcy as a villager at the seaport

== Production ==
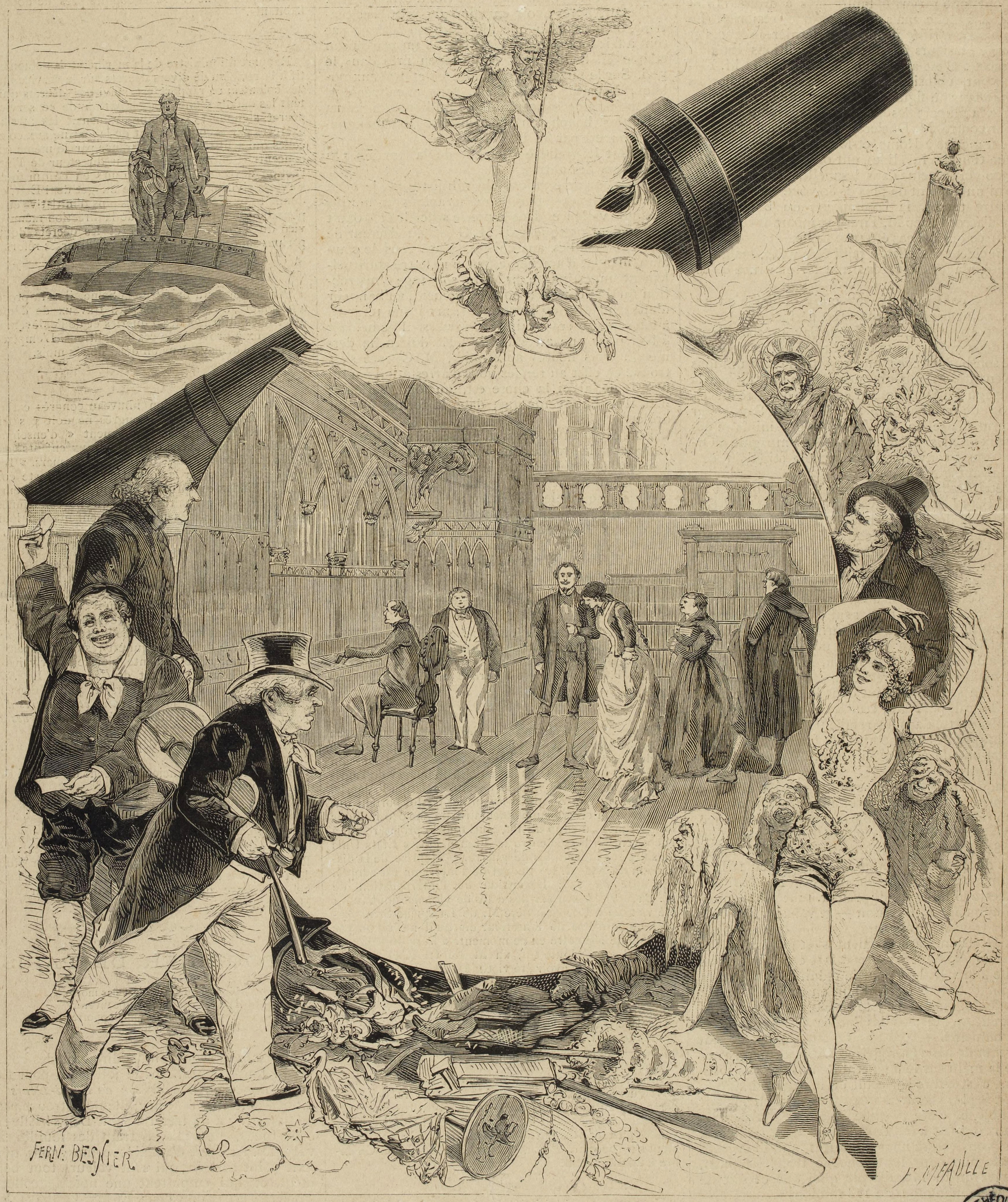
Engraving of the play Journey Through the Impossible, one of Méliès's inspirations

The original French title of the film, Le Voyage à travers l'impossible, comes from a stage spectacular of the same name, written in 1882 by Jules Verne and Adolphe d'Ennery. Méliès was probably inspired by memories of this play, but otherwise the film bears little connection to it; the plot structure appears to be inspired more closely by a previous Méliès hit, A Trip to the Moon.

The Impossible Voyage was made during the summer of 1904. The film, running to 374 meters (about 20 minutes at silent-film projection speeds), was Méliès's longest to date, and cost about ₣37,500 (US$7,500) to make. In its staging and design, the film is symmetrical with A Trip to the Moon: while the astronomers' progress toward the Moon in that film is consistently depicted as left-to-right motion, the Institute of Incoherent Geography's progress toward the Sun in The Impossible Voyage is consistently right-to-left. While most of the film was shot inside Méliès's glass studio, the scene at the foot of the Jungfrau was filmed outdoors, in the garden of Méliès's property in Montreuil, Seine-Saint-Denis. The factory set in the second scene recalls the Hall des Machines at the Paris Exposition of 1900. Techniques used for special effects include stage machinery (including scenery rolling horizontally and vertically), pyrotechnics, miniature effects, substitution splices, and dissolves.

== Release ==
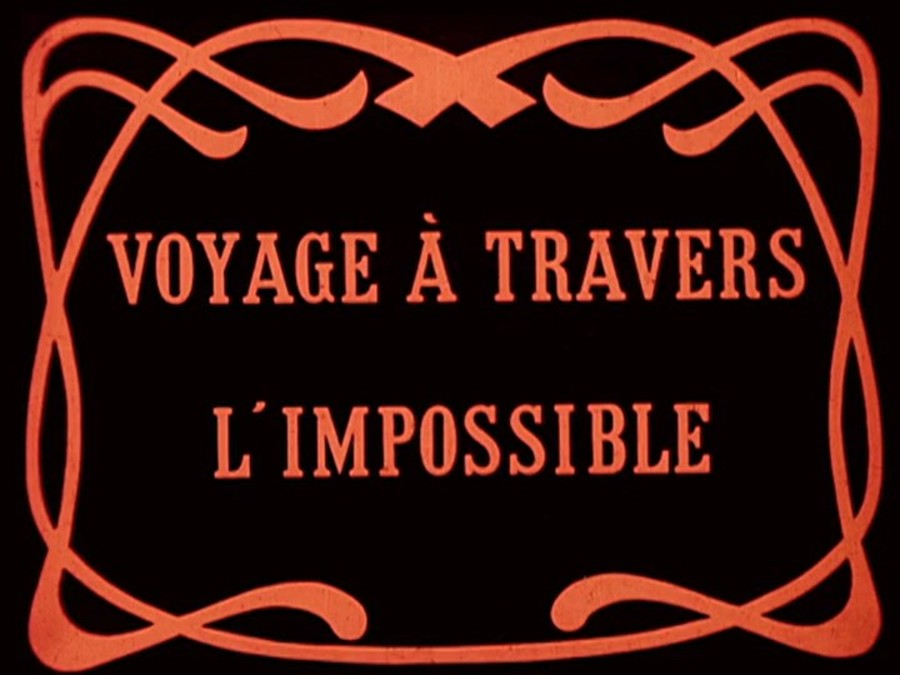
Another title card used for the film

The film was released by Méliès's Star Film Company and numbered 641–659 in its catalogues, where it was advertised as an Invraisemblable équipée d'un groupe de savants de la Société de Géographie incohérente; pièce fantastique nouvelle en 40 tableaux. (The optional supplementary section was sold separately and numbered 660–661.) The earliest known English-language catalogues give the title as An Impossible Voyage in the United States and Whirling the Worlds in Britain.

The French catalogue descriptions give French names for many of the characters: the engineer is Mabouloff, and the Institute's membership includes Professor Latrouille (its president), Madame Latrouille, Madame Mabouloff, Secretary Foulard, Archivist Lataupe, Vice-President Patoche, and Professor Ventrouillard (who proposes the unaccepted project at the beginning of the film). The American catalogue gives Anglicized names (see Plot section above), while Mabouloff/Crazyloff's servant is called Bob in both languages.

A print of the film (though not the supplemental epilogue) was deposited for American copyright at the Library of Congress on October 12, 1904. As with at least 4% of Méliès's entire output, some prints were individually hand-colored and sold at a higher price. In the late twentieth century, a surviving hand-colored copy was donated to Méliès's family by the Czech Film Archive.

== Reception ==
A surviving print of the film

The Impossible Voyage was one of the most popular films of the first few years of the twentieth century, rivaled only by similar Méliès films such as The Kingdom of the Fairies and the massively successful A Trip to the Moon. The film critic Lewis Jacobs said of the film:

This film expressed all of Méliès's talents. In it his feeling for caricature, painting, theatrical invention and camera science became triumphant. The complexity of his tricks, his resourcefulness with mechanical contrivances, the imaginativeness of the settings and the sumptuous tableaux made the film a masterpiece for its day.

Film scholar Elizabeth Ezra highlights the film's sharp social satire, noting how the rich but inept members of the Institute "wreak havoc wherever they go, disrupting the lives of bucolic mountain climbers, alpine villagers, factory workers and sailors," and arguing that this conflict between upper classes and working classes is mirrored by other contrasts in the film (heat and ice, Sun and sea, and so on).

== See also ==
- List of underwater science fiction works

== Works cited ==
- Bertrand, Aude (2010), Georges Méliès et les professionnels de son temps (PDF) (MA thesis), Université de Lyon, p. 119
- Essai de reconstitution du catalogue français de la Star-Film; suivi d'une analyse catalographique des films de Georges Méliès recensés en France, Bois d'Arcy: Service des archives du film du Centre national de la cinématographie, 1981, ISBN 2903053073
- Ezra, Elizabeth (2000), Georges Méliès: The Birth of the Auteur, Manchester: Manchester University Press, ISBN 0-7190-5395-1
- Frazer, John (1979), Artificially Arranged Scenes: The Films of Georges Méliès, Boston: G. K. Hall & Co., ISBN 0816183686
- Malthête, Jacques; Mannoni, Laurent (2008), L'oeuvre de Georges Méliès, Paris: Éditions de La Martinière, ISBN 9782732437323
- Méliès, Georges (1905), Complete Catalogue of Genuine and Original "Star" Films, New York: Geo. Méliès
- Solomon, Matthew (2011), "Introduction", in Solomon, Matthew (ed.), Fantastic Voyages of the Cinematic Imagination: Georges Méliès's Trip to the Moon, Albany: State University of New York Press, pp. 1–24, ISBN 9781438435817
- Yumibe, Joshua (2012), Moving Color: Early Film, Mass Culture, Modernism, New Brunswick, N.J.: Rutgers University Press, ISBN 9780813552965
