= List of reconstructed actualities by Georges Méliès =

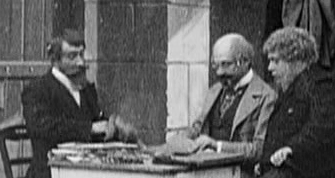
Georges Méliès (left) as Fernand Labori in the reconstructed actuality Dreyfus Meets His Wife at Rennes (1899)

"Behind the theater is life and behind life, the theater. … Why not make reconstructed newsreels like Méliès did? Today we should show Castro and Johnson, played by actors. … People would love all that."

— Jean-Luc Godard

Between 1897 and 1902, the French filmmaker Georges Méliès (1861–1938) made numerous actualités reconstituées ("reconstructed actualities" or "reconstructed newsreels"). Unlike conventional actuality films, which presented real-life events or simple naturalistic scenes filmed in a documentary style, these reconstructed actualities were dramatically staged reenactments of current events, employing miniature models and theatrical techniques. Méliès particularly focused on capturing the spectacular nature of the events he recreated. While little is known of the exact release dates for many of Méliès's films, it appears that the reconstructed actualities were offered for sale soon after the events they portrayed, when the news was still fresh in viewers' minds.

These reconstructed actualities are part of a wider tradition of "faked" news film, a genre very popular in the early years of cinema. Between 1894 and 1900, every major film studio regularly produced reenactments of current events. Some of these films were deliberate hoaxes, intended to be misconstrued as actual footage of the events they portrayed; others were made with no intention to mislead audiences, and were designed simply as illustrations of the events. In the case of Méliès, the reconstructed actualities were deliberately described as reenactments, and were not intended to be misconstrued as real. However, contemporary accounts suggest that some viewers assumed the films were genuine, and a few exhibitors even advertised the films falsely as such. After a sustained period of popularity, the genre fell out of favor in the 1910s, apparently due to growing public distaste for artificiality in film reportage.

Méliès's reconstructed actualities have been described as an early form of docudrama. They can also be compared to the newspaper and magazine engravings of Méliès's time, many of which made a similar attempt to capture the essence of a news event rather than to simulate it realistically.

== Films ==
The following annotated list collects the Méliès films identified by scholars as reconstructed actualities. The list includes the numbers assigned to them in the catalogues of Méliès's studio, the Star Film Company; the original French and English titles; the date of release; and whether the film survives or is presumed lost. Unless otherwise referenced, these data are derived from research published in 2008 by Jacques Malthête and Laurent Mannoni.

=== Greco-Turkish War ===
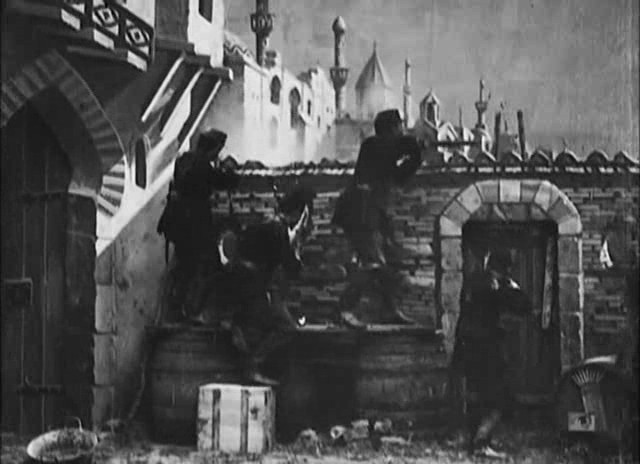
The Surrender of Tournavos

In the 1890s, about two-thirds of Greek people lived in lands controlled by Turkey (i.e., the Ottoman Empire), such as the Greek island of Crete. Greek uprisings had occurred sporadically within the Empire from the 1860s onward; massacres occurred on both sides. On 10 February 1897, a group of Greeks on Crete were killed in a massacre led by Turks. Numerous European powers intervened, and war between Greece and Turkey was declared on 18 April. The Greco-Turkish War ended when the involved European forces, not wanting Greece to be annexed by Turkey, arranged an armistice on 18 May.

The Greco-Turkish War was the first military conflict to be captured on motion-picture film, as well as the first one to be recreated for the cinema with staged reconstructions. One contemporary reviewer described Méliès's Greco-Turkish War films as "wonderfully realistic and extremely popular" thanks to "good scene-painting and realistic actors."

No.	French title	English title	Date	Status
103–104	Épisode de guerre	War Episodes	1897	Lost
Very little is known about this film, which was listed as a Greco-Turkish War reconstruction by some twentieth-century Méliès scholars, including Georges Sadoul. However, it is not included in Malthête and Mannoni's more recent list of Méliès's Greco-Turkish War films. Since it appears to have been advertised under the title La Défense de Bazeilles, it was probably a film about the Battle of Bazeilles during the Franco-Prussian War of 1870.
106	La Prise de Tournavos	The Surrender of Tournavos	1897	Survives
In a skirmish in the Greek town of Tyrnavos, 20–23 April 1897, Turkish forces overpowered Greek forces, who subsequently left the city. Méliès's film shows Greek and Turkish soldiers fighting in a walled courtyard during this skirmish. See the main article for more information.
107	Exécution d'un espion	Execution of a Spy	1897	Lost
According to a British advertisement, this film showed a Greek spy being executed in Farsala, where the Greek forces had retreated (23–25 April) before it in turn was attacked by the Turks. In Germany and the Netherlands, however, exhibitors claimed that the film showed the execution of a Turkish spy.
108	Massacres en Crète	Massacre in Crete	1897	Lost
This film recreated one of the Turkish massacres of Christian Greeks, shortly before the beginning of the war. The following recollection of a faked Greco-Turkish War film, reported secondhand by Frederick Villiers, is probably a description of Massacre in Crete: "Three Albanians came along a very white, dusty road toward a cottage on the right of the screen. As they neared it they opened fire; you could see the bullets strike the stucco of the building. Then one of the Turks with the butt end of his rifle smashed in the door of the cottage, entered, and brought out a lovely Athenian maid in his arms. You could see her struggling and fighting for liberty. Presently an old man, evidently the girl's father, rushed out of the house to her rescue, when the second Albanian whipped out his yataghan from his belt and cut the old gentleman's head off."
110	Combat naval en Grèce	Sea Fighting in Greece	1897	Survives
In one of the Greco-Turkish War's few naval engagements, the Greek Navy attacked the town of Preveza (18–20 April). According to a British advertisement, this was the engagement featured in the film, which simulates the pitching and rolling deck of a man-of-war under fire. See the main article for more information.

=== Revolts in India ===
In June–August 1897, on the northwestern frontier of India, Indians revolted against British colonists. Méliès made two films about the revolts.

No.	French title	English title	Date	Status
134	Combat dans une rue aux Indes	Fighting in the Streets in India	1897	Lost
No further information available.
135	Attaque d'un poste anglais	Attack of an English Blockhouse	1897	Lost
No further information available.

=== Spanish–American War ===
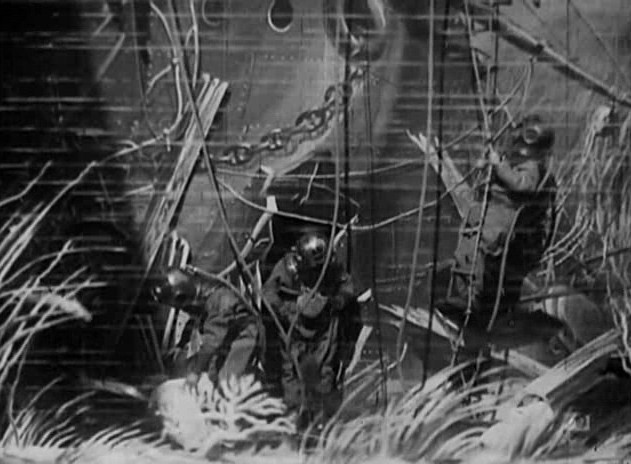
Divers at Work on the Wreck of the "Maine"

The Spanish–American War broke out when, after the explosion and sinking of the USS Maine in Havana Harbor on 15 February 1898, the United States intervened in the Cuban War of Independence. The Spanish navy was defeated in the Battle of Santiago de Cuba and the Battle of Manila Bay, and the Treaty of Paris on 10 December 1898 signaled the end of the Spanish Empire.

Méliès's films about the war, produced to a more ambitious standard than his Greco-Turkish reconstructions had been, cover the sinking of the Maine as well as the ensuing conflict between Spain and the United States. According to an announcement published on 1 May 1898, these films were presented at Méliès's theatre of illusions in Paris, the Théâtre de Robert-Houdin.

No.	French title	English title	Date	Status
143	Collision et Naufrage en mer	Collision and Shipwreck at Sea	1898	Lost
Very little is known about this film. The Méliès scholar Jacques Malthête lists it as a reconstructed actuality about the Spanish–American War, but the war film scholar Stephen Bottomore considers this unlikely.
144–145	Quais de La Havane (Explosion du cuirassé Le Maine)	The Blowing up of the "Maine" in Havana Harbor	1898	Lost
This film, showing the sinking of the Maine, may have used a miniature model. Since it was of double length, the film may have included two shots, one of which may have been actuality film footage. An American screening of the film was described as "illustrating the manner in which the Spaniards blew up our Battleship;" in Britain, the Warwick Trading Company called it simply "a faithful portrayal of this deplorable incident of the Spanish–American War."
146	Visite de l'épave du Maine	A View of the Wreck of the "Maine"	1898	Lost
No further information is available about this film, which may simply have been an alternative version of the ensuing film, number 147.
147	Visite sous-marine du Maine (plongeurs et poissons vivants)	Divers at Work on the Wreck of the "Maine" (US); Divers at Work on a Wreck Under Sea (UK)	1898	Survives
This film, the most successful of the series, was shot through an aquarium to create an "underwater" effect with real fish, and shows divers retrieving a corpse from the wrecked ship. See the main article for more information.
150	Combat naval devant Manille	Defending the Fort at Manila (US); Defending the Fort (UK)	1898	Lost
This film showed a Spanish shore fortification being attacked by American gunfire. A contemporary synopsis described it as follows: "The interior of a fort. A big gun fires a salvo at the enemy. Many shells hit the fort and smash the walls. An enemy shell falls on the artillerymen, killing and wounding some of them." Since this film showed a war incident from the Spanish point of view, it is possible that Méliès, like most of the French public, supported the Spanish side of the war rather than the American intervention.

=== The Dreyfus Affair ===
During or shortly after the trial of Alfred Dreyfus in Rennes, Méliès made a series of eleven short films about the Dreyfus affair. The series remains the most famous of Méliès's works in the reconstructed actuality genre, and the film historian Georges Sadoul described it as the first "politically engaged" work in cinema history. See the main article for more information.

=== Final reconstructed actualities ===
In 1902, Méliès made three final works in the reconstructed actuality genre: The Eruption of Mount Pelee, The Catastrophe of the Balloon "Le Pax", and his most complex reconstruction, The Coronation of Edward VII.

No.	French title	English title	Date	Status
397	Éruption volcanique à la Martinique	The Eruption of Mount Pelee (US); The Terrible Eruption of Mount Pelée and Destruction of St. Pierre, Martinique (UK)	1902	Survives
This film uses miniature models to illustrate the eruption on 8 May 1902 of Mount Pelée, which destroyed the town of Saint-Pierre, Martinique. See the main article for more information.
398	Catastrophe du Ballon Le Pax	The Catastrophe of the Balloon "Le Pax"	1902	Lost
This film was based on a balloon disaster that occurred in Paris on 12 May 1902. See the main article for more information.
— (Note: Not sold through the Star Films catalogues; commissioned and distributed by Charles Urban of the Warwick Trading Company)	Le Sacre d'Édouard VII	The Coronation of Edward VII	1902	Survives
This film, simulating the coronation of King Edward VII and Queen Alexandra before the actual event took place, was Méliès's most complex reconstructed actuality, and was successful worldwide. See the main article for more information.

== Notes ==
=== Citations ===
- Barnes, John (1992), Filming the Boer War, London: Bishopgate Press, ISBN 1852190469
- Bottomore, Stephen (2007), Filming, faking and propaganda: The origins of the war film, 1897–1902 (PDF) (thesis), Utrecht University
- Ezra, Elizabeth (2000), Georges Méliès, Manchester: Manchester University Press, ISBN 0-7190-5395-1
- Frazer, John (1979), Artificially Arranged Scenes: The Films of Georges Méliès, Boston: G. K. Hall & Co., ISBN 0-8161-8368-6
- Malthête, Jacques; Mannoni, Laurent (2008), L'oeuvre de Georges Méliès, Paris: Éditions de La Martinière, ISBN 978-2-7324-3732-3
- Rosen, Miriam (1987), "Méliès, Georges", in Wakeman, John (ed.), World Film Directors: Volume I, 1890–1945, New York: The H. W. Wilson Company, pp. 747–765, ISBN 0-8242-0757-2
- Solomon, Matthew (2010), Disappearing Tricks: Silent Film, Houdini, and the New Magic of the Twentieth Century, Urbana: University of Illinois Press, ISBN 9780252035104
- Sadoul, Georges; Morris, Peter (1972), Dictionary of Films, Berkeley: University of California Press, ISBN 9780520021525

Reconstructed actualities by Georges Méliès at the Internet Movie Database
- War Episodes
- The Surrender of Tournavos
- Execution of a Spy
- Massacre in Crete
- Sea Fighting in Greece
- Fighting in the Streets in India
- Attack of an English Blockhouse
- Collision and Shipwreck at Sea
- The Blowing up of the "Maine" in Havana Harbor
- A View of the Wreck of the "Maine"
- Divers at Work on the Wreck of the "Maine"
- Defending the Fort at Manila
- The Dreyfus Affair
- The Eruption of Mount Pelee
- The Catastrophe of the Balloon "Le Pax"
- The Coronation of Edward VII
