= China Versus Allied Powers =

- Directed by: Georges Méliès
- Production company: Star Film Company
- Release date: 1900
- Running time: 20 meters Approx. 1 minute
- Country: France
- Language: Silent

Le Congrès des Nations en Chine, released in the US as China Versus Allied Powers and in the UK as China Versus the Allied Nations, and also known as The Congress of Nations in China: A Topical Creation and China Against the Allies, is a 1900 French silent satirical trick film directed by Georges Méliès. It was released by Méliès's Star Film Company and is numbered 327 in its catalogues.

== Plot ==
According to a surviving catalogue description of the film:

A magician presents a circular piece of paper from which he removes the flags of the allies. Then from each flag he produces a soldier from the respective country, and finally he produces a Chinaman. But hardly have the allies seen the latter than they pounce on him and try to cut him into pieces. The funniest part of our story is that the Chinaman escapes in a balloon, with an expression of childish innocence on his face as the allies try to cut him up.

== Production ==
The film, probably made in the late summer of 1900, satirizes the allied coalition (Germany, Austria-Hungary, the United States, France, Italy, Japan, the United Kingdom, and Russia) that was then staging military interventions in China, shortly before the Boxer Rebellion. (The rebellion itself is not mentioned in the surviving description of the film, and probably postdates it.)

By 1900, Méliès had already filmed numerous "reconstructed newsreels" (staged reenactments of current events) relating to war topics. China Against Allied Powers, though similarly topical, took a different stylistic route, representing the conflict symbolically. Méliès, whose films often side with the underdog (as is evidenced, for instance, in his film series The Dreyfus Affair), reveals a pro-China stance in this film; this was a highly unusual position among European filmmakers, and indeed no other known film made at the time about the Chinese conflict portrays China sympathetically.

The film is currently presumed lost.

== Related films ==
The American film The Congress of Nations, directed by J. Stuart Blackton of Vitagraph Studios for the Edison Manufacturing Company and copyrighted in September 1900, has a very similar plot, and may have been modeled on Méliès's film. Blackton's film, made in collaboration with the English magician and filmmaker Albert E. Smith and featuring Smith onscreen, survives as a paper print. Blackton and Smith also borrowed the dissolve technique used in the film from Méliès, who had pioneered it in his successful 1899 film Cinderella. The magician in the Blackton version, having produced flags and personifications of the nations involved, allows his Allied soldiers to attack a nonmilitary "Chinese" character (actually a Vitagraph clerk, Morris Brenner) for a few moments before replacing the conflict with a huge American flag and a patriotic tableau.
