= The Dreyfus Affair (film series) =

1899 French series of eleven short films by Georges Méliès

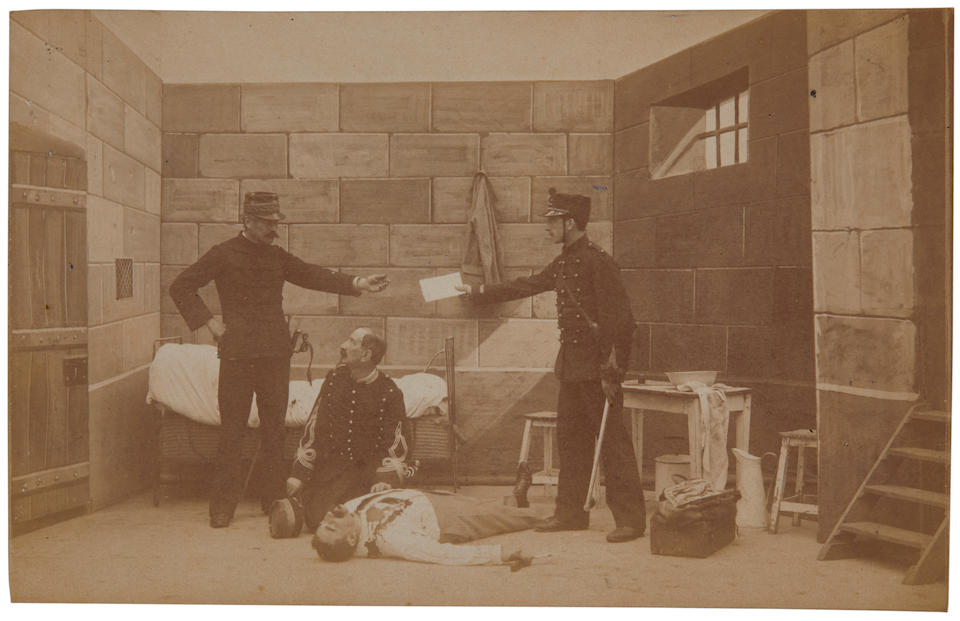
- Production still from the fifth installment
- Directed by: Georges Méliès
- Production company: Star Film Company
- Distributed by: Star Film Company; Warwick Trading Company
- Release date: September 1899
- Running time: 240 meters/780 feet total; Approx. 13 minutes total
- Country: France
- Language: Silent

The Dreyfus Affair (French: L'affaire Dreyfus), also known as Dreyfus Court-Martial, is an 1899 series of eleven short silent films by Georges Méliès. Each of the eleven one-minute installments reconstructs an event from the real-life Dreyfus affair, which was still in progress while the series was being made. The series follows the case from Alfred Dreyfus's arrest on suspicion of espionage, through his imprisonments on Devil's Island and in Rennes, to his trial and conviction for treason; related events are also included, including the suicide of a main Dreyfus accuser, an unknown gunman's attempt to murder Dreyfus's attorney, and a public conflict between pro- and anti-Dreyfus factions. The series was acted in a restrained, realistic style vastly unlike Méliès's better-known fantasy films; the scenes were staged and advertised to suggest accurately that Dreyfus was innocent of espionage and had been framed.

The real-life Dreyfus Affair attracted immense attention both in France and in Britain, and numerous films were made in both countries about the case. Méliès's version was highly publicized, and later recollections and legends claim that it caused considerable interest and controversy at the time. It remains the most famous example of Méliès's staged reconstructions of current events ("reconstructed actualities"), and nine of the eleven installments are known with certainty to survive.

== Summary ==
Nine installments of the series

The eleven installments of the series follow the events of the Dreyfus affair from 1894 through September 1899, the month of the series' release. The following is a summary of the series's overarching storyline. For information on the individual installments, see the Installments section below.

In 1894, Armand du Paty de Clam suspects the French military captain Alfred Dreyfus of being a spy for Germany. Paty de Clam demands a sample of Dreyfus's handwriting, to see if it matches the writing on the Bordereau (an anonymous letter to the German Embassy that has been discovered by French counterintelligence). Finding that Dreyfus seems nervous, Paty de Clam accuses him outright of having written the Bordereau, and offers a gun so that Dreyfus can commit suicide on the spot. Dreyfus protests that he is innocent, and is arrested. At the École Militaire, Dreyfus is stripped of his rank and honors, and he is sent to be clapped in irons in prison on Devil's Island.

Four years later, Colonel Hubert-Joseph Henry, who had accused Dreyfus publicly, is arrested (he has admitted to having forged the Faux Henry, a false document designed to act as evidence against Dreyfus). Henry commits suicide in Cherche-Midi prison. The next year, in 1899, Dreyfus is transferred from Devil's Island via Quiberon to Rennes, where he will be tried by court-martial now that further evidence has surfaced. His defense attorneys Fernand Labori and Edgar Demange visit him, as does his wife Lucie. Later, when walking with Georges Picquart, Labori is struck down by a bullet. Labori survives, but the shooter escapes.

The case splits popular opinion into two sides: the Dreyfusards (who believe Dreyfus is innocent) and the anti-Dreyfusards (who believe he is guilty). The court martial is heavily attended by journalists on both sides, and a fight breaks out as controversy rages between the Dreyfusard reporter Caroline Rémy de Guebhard and the anti-Dreyfusard reporter Arthur Meyer. The turmoil is hardly more contained in the trial itself, when Dreyfus and General Auguste Mercier (called as a witness) are cross-examined. Dreyfus, convicted of treason, is led back to prison.

=== Installments ===
The table below gives each installment's chronological order (#), numbering in Star Film catalogs (SFC), English release titles for the US and UK, original French title, and length in meters (m), as well as the individual scene summaries from the catalog released on 1 November 1899 by the Warwick Trading Company, the only known British firm to sell all eleven installments of the series.

No.	SFC	English title(s)	French title	m
1	206	Dreyfus Court Martial—Arrest of Dreyfus (US); Arrest of Dreyfus, 1894 (UK)	Dictée du bordereau (arrestation de Dreyfus)	20
"Du Paty de Clam requests Captain Dreyfus to write as he dictates for the purpose of ascertaining whether his handwriting conforms to that of the Bordereau. He notices the nervousness of Dreyfus, and accuses him of being the author of the Bordereau. Paty de Clam offers Dreyfus a revolver, with advice to commit suicide. The revolver is scornfully rejected, Dreyfus stating that he had no need for such cowardly methods, proclaiming his innocence. His arrest is immediately ordered by M. Cochefort."
2	216	The Degradation of Dreyfus (US); The Degradation of Dreyfus in 1894 (UK) (Note: Numbered 217 in London-published Star Film catalogs)	La Dégradation	20
"Shows the troops ranging in a quadrant inside the yard of the Military School in Paris. The Adjutant, who conducts the degradation, reads the sentence and proceeds to tear off in succession all of the buttons, laces, and ornaments from the uniform of Captain Dreyfus, who is compelled to pass in disgrace before the troops. A most visual representation of this first act of injustice to Dreyfus."
3	207	Devil's Island—Within the palisade (US); Dreyfus at Devil's Island—Within the palisade (UK)	La Case de Dreyfus à l'île du Diable	20
"The scene opens within the Palisades, showing Dreyfus seated on a block meditating. The guard enters bearing a letter from his wife, which he hands to Captain Dreyfus. The latter reads it and endeavours to talk to the Guard, who, however, refuses to reply, according to strict orders from his Government, causing Dreyfus to become very despondent."
4	208	Dreyfus Put in Irons (US); Dreyfus Put in Irons—Inside Cell at Devil's Island (UK)	Dreyfus mis aux fers (la double boucle)	20
"Showing the interior view of the hut in which Dreyfus is confined. The scene takes place at night, showing the moon through the window of the cell. Two guards stealthily approach the cot upon which Dreyfus is sleeping. They awake him and read to him the order from the French minister–M. Lebon–to put him into irons, which they proceed at once to accomplish. Dreyfus vigorously protests against this treatment, which protests, however, fall on deaf ears. The chief sergeant and guards before leaving the hut, inspect the four corners of same by means of a lantern."
5	209	Suicide of Colonel Henry (US, UK)	Suicide du colonel Henry	20
"Shows the interior of the cell of the Prison Militaire du Cherche-Midi, Paris, where Colonel Henry is confined. He is seated at a table writing a letter, on completion of which he rises and takes a razor out he had concealed in his porte-manteau, with which he cuts his throat. The suicide is discovered by the sergeant of the guard and officers."
6	210	Landing of Dreyfus at Quiberon (US); Landing of Dreyfus from Devil's Island (UK)	Débarquement de Dreyfus à Quiberon	20
"A section of the port Haliquen (Quiberon) Bretagne, at night where Dreyfus was landed by French marines, and officers after his transport from Devil's Island. He is received by the French authorities, officers, and gendarmes, and conducted to the station for his departure to Rennes. This little scene was enacted on a dark rainy night, which is clearly shown in the film. The effects are further heightened by vivid flashes of lightning which are certainly new in cinematography."
7	211	Dreyfus Meets His Wife at Rennes (US); Dreyfus in Prison of Rennes (UK)	Entrevue de Dreyfus et de sa femme (prison de Rennes)	20
"Showing room at the military prison at Rennes in which Dreyfus the accused is confined. He is visited by his counsel, Maître Labori and Demange, with whom he is seen in animated conversation. A visit from his wife is announced, who enters. The meeting of the husband and wife is most pathetic and emotional."
8	212	The Attempt Against the Life of Maitre Labori (US); The Attempt Against Maitre Labori (UK)	Attentat contre M^{e} Labori	20
"Maître Labori is seen approaching the bridge of Rennes in company with Colonel Picquart and M. Gast, Mayor of Rennes. They notice that they are followed by another man to whom Colonel Picquart calls Labori's attention. They, however, consider his proximity of no importance, and continue to speak together. As soon as their backs are turned, the man draws a revolver and fires twice at Maître Labori, who is seen to fall to the ground. The culprit makes his escape, pursued by Colonel Picquart and M. Gast."
9	213	The Fight of Reporters at the Lycée (US); The Fight of Journalists at the Lycee (UK)	Suspension d'audience (bagarre entre journalistes)	20
"During an interval in the proceedings of the court martial, the journalists enter into an animated discussion, resulting in a dispute between Arthur Meyer of the 'Gaulois', and Mme. Severine of the 'Fronde', resulting in a fight between Dreyfusards and Anti-Dreyfusards, in which canes and chairs are brought down upon the heads of many. The room is finally cleared by the gendarmes."
10	214–215	The Court Martial at Rennes (US, UK)	Le Conseil de guerre en séance à Rennes	40
"A scene in the Lycee at Rennes, showing the military court-martial of Captain Dreyfus. The only occupants of the room at this time are Maître Demange and secretary. Other advocates and the stenographers now begin to arrive and the sergeant is seen announcing the arrival of Colonel Jouaust and other officers comprising the seven judges of the court-martial. The five duty judges are also seen in the background. On the left of the picture are seen Commander Cordier and Adjutant Coupois, with their stenographers and gendarmes. On the right are seen Maître Demange, Labori, and their secretaries. Colonel Jouaust orders the Sergeant of the Police to bring in Dreyfus. Dreyfus enters, saluting the Court, followed by the Captain of Gendarmerie, who is constantly with him. They take their appointed seats in front of the judges. Colonel Jouaust puts several questions to Dreyfus, to which he replies in a standing position. He then asks Adjutant Coupois to call the first witness, and General Mercier arrives. He states that his deposition is a lengthy one, and requests a chair, which is passed to him by a gendarme. In a sitting position he proceeds with his deposition. Animated discussion and cross-questioning is exchanged between Colonel Jouaust, General Mercier, and Maître Demange. Captain Dreyfus much excited gets up and vigorously protests against these proceedings. This scene, which is a most faithful portrayal of this proceeding, shows the absolute portraits of over thirty of the principal personages in this famous trial."
11	217	Dreyfus Leaving the Lycée for Jail (US); Officers and Dreyfus Leaving the Lycee (UK) (Note: Numbered 216 in London-published Star Film catalogs)	Dreyfus allant du lycée de Rennes à la prison	20
"The exterior of the Lycee de Rennes, where the famous Dreyfus Court-Martial was conducted, showing the French staff leaving the building after the sitting, and crossing the yard between the French soldiers forming a double line. Maîtres Demange and Labori also make their appearance, walking towards the foreground of the picture, and at length Captain Dreyfus is seen approaching, being accompanied by the Captain of Gendarmes, who is conducting him back to prison."

== Production ==
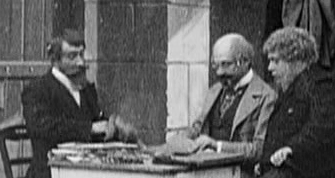
Méliès (left) as Labori, with the actors playing Dreyfus and Demange, in Dreyfus Meets His Wife at Rennes

The French public paid intense attention to the Dreyfus affair, with high interest in films relating to the case. One story goes that Francis Doublier, a filmmaker working for the Lumière brothers, went so far in 1898 as to string together unconnected film clips, presenting the melange with a running spoken commentary claiming that he was showing Dreyfus, the courthouse where he was sentenced to Devil's Island, and the ship carrying him there. The hoax was revealed when one audience member pointed out that the events supposedly on view had happened in 1894 and early 1895, before motion-picture film was in use. The French branch of the Biograph Company captured short clips of newsreel footage of the trial at Rennes, while its English counterpart released two fictional films inspired by the affair. Méliès's version of The Dreyfus Affair may have been commissioned by the Warwick Trading Company, which distributed Méliès's films to British projectionists. At about the same time as Méliès's production, the studio Pathé Frères also produced a reenactment of the Dreyfus affair, in six episodes, with the actor Jean Liézer as Dreyfus. This version may have been directed by Ferdinand Zecca.

Production of Méliès's The Dreyfus Affair began while the real-life Alfred Dreyfus's trial was proceeding in Rennes. The series was made entirely in Méliès's Star Films studio in Montreuil, Seine-Saint-Denis, though with a strong emphasis on cinematic realism markedly different from the energetic theatrical style used in Méliès's better-known fantasy films. The series is an elaborate example of Méliès's actualitiés reconstituées ("reconstructed actualities"), films in which current events were recreated in an evocative docudrama-like format.

An ironworker with a strong resemblance to Dreyfus was hired for the role in order to increase the series's realism. Méliès himself appears in the series as Dreyfus's attorney Fernand Labori and makes a brief reappearance as a journalist after Labori's attempted assassination. At least one scene, Dreyfus's exit from the courthouse, appears to have been modelled on a news photograph printed in the journal L'Illustration. Méliès drew on both cinematic and theatrical special effects for the series: the lightning in Landing of Dreyfus at Quiberon was added to the scene using multiple exposure, while the rain and rocking motion of the boat were created with stage machinery. The gun smoke in The Attempt Against the Life of Maitre Labori is a puff of poudre de riz, a cosmetic powder.

Taken as a whole, The Dreyfus Affair can be considered Méliès's longest film up to that date, and it has sometimes been described as such. However, the eleven installments were designed to be sold individually, so it is more accurate to refer to The Dreyfus Affair as a series. (Méliès himself, in recollections late in life, was inconsistent on the point: he once referred to The Dreyfus Affair as a film, but also once said his first long-format film was Cinderella, made later the same year.)

== Themes ==
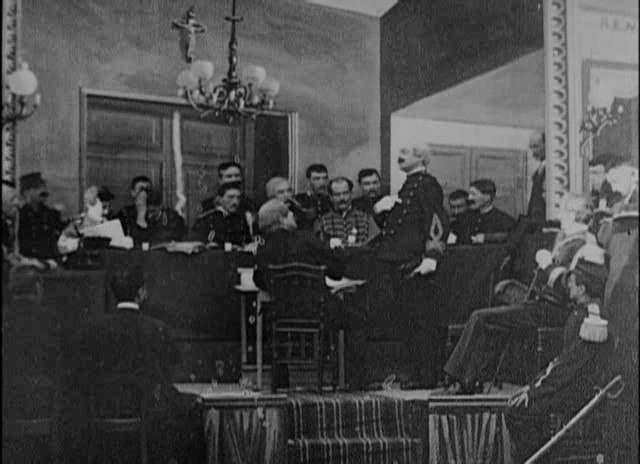
Dreyfus pleads his innocence in the tenth installment

The Dreyfus Affair portrays Dreyfus sympathetically, and the lead actor's performance is staged to imply strongly that Dreyfus is innocent. Méliès's casting of himself as Labori has also been taken as an implied support of Dreyfus's cause. In recollections written late in life, Méliès claimed that he had intended to create an objective, nonpartisan illustration of the events of the case. However, the English-language description of the series, which may have been written by Méliès, describes the degradation ceremony as the "first act of injustice to Dreyfus", and a surviving English advertisement for the Devil's Island installment announces that the film shows Dreyfus as a martyr.

Images of characters reading and writing are pervasive throughout the series, serving as a constant reminder of the importance of various documents to the Dreyfus affair. In her book-length study of Méliès, the film scholar Elizabeth Ezra suggests that the writerly imagery also points to "film's potential to be a new form of document", a self-reflexive comment on the filming process itself. Ezra also highlights uses of thematic imagery such as the courtroom's prominent crucifix, a "stigma evoking at once Dreyfus's similarity to the Christian icon through a shared martyrdom, and his alienation from Christianity, through his Jewish heritage."

== Release and reception ==
"There is a basic confusion concerning the newsreel film. They said that Lumière invented the newsreel—it was Méliès. Lumière photographed train stations, horse races, families in the garden—i.e. the stuff of impressionist painting. Méliès filmed a trip to the moon, President Fallières visiting Yugoslavia, the eruption of Mount Pelée, Dreyfus."

—Jean-Luc Godard, La Chinoise

The series was sold by Méliès's Star Film Company and numbered 206–217 in its catalogs. The eleven installments were sold at US$9.75 each, and were sometimes shown in sequence, making The Dreyfus Affair the first known film serial. Both Méliès's and Pathé's versions reached England in September 1899, where they quickly became the most extensively advertised films of that year (the record was broken the following month with the release of films of the Transvaal War). According to the film historian Jay Leyda, Méliès's emphasis on realism was so convincing that European audiences believed they were watching actual documentary film of the events.

In a 1930 article for the Paris magazine L'Œuvre, Lucien Wahl recollected that The Dreyfus Affair had caused riotous reactions in France, with Dreyfusards and anti-Dreyfusards arguing noisily during screenings. In a published response, Méliès himself agreed that the scenes had caused riots, and added that the violent responses had led to the French government banning the series. Though these details were quickly taken up by film historians and reprinted, there is no evidence that the series was banned immediately on a national level; Méliès continued to sell it in his catalogues until 1906, seven years later. Similarly, no known French newspapers of the time reported on riots occurring when the series was screened. However, it is possible that some local French officials and exhibitors held a moratorium on Dreyfus-related films due to their controversial nature, as some British cinema owners are known to have done. In addition, the French government did legislate in 1915 to forbid all films relating to Dreyfus, including foreign imports, and did not lift this ban until 1950.

Nine of the eleven installments (all except scenes 2 and 11, catalog numbers 216 and 217) survive as a 35mm positive print at the BFI National Archive. All eleven installments of the series are listed as surviving at the Centre national de la cinématographie in Bois d'Arcy.

The Dreyfus Affair remains the most famous of Méliès's reconstructed actualities, surpassing even his highly successful 1902 work in the genre, The Coronation of Edward VII. The film historian Georges Sadoul believed The Dreyfus Affair to be the first "politically engaged film" in the history of cinema. In a study of the Dreyfus affair, the cultural historian Venita Datta comments appreciatively on the dramatic power of Méliès's series, with the combat between Dreyfusard and anti-Dreyfusard journalists "brilliantly played up". The series is prominently featured in Susan Daitch's 2001 novel Paper Conspiracies, which includes fictionalized accounts of its making, preservation, and survival.

== Notes ==
=== Citations ===
- Barnes, John (1992), Filming the Boer War, London: Bishopgate Press, ISBN 1852190469
- Datta, Venita (2013), "The Dreyfus Affair as National Theater", in Katz, Maya Balakirsky (ed.), Revising Dreyfus, Leiden: Brill, pp. 25–60, ISBN 9789004256958
- Essai de reconstitution du catalogue français de la Star-Film; suivi d'une analyse catalographique des films de Georges Méliès recensés en France, Bois d'Arcy: Service des archives du film du Centre national de la cinématographie, 1981, ISBN 2903053073
- Ezra, Elizabeth (2000), Georges Méliès, Manchester: Manchester University Press, ISBN 0-7190-5395-1
- Frazer, John (1979), Artificially Arranged Scenes: The Films of Georges Méliès, Boston: G. K. Hall & Co., ISBN 0816183686
- Hammond, Paul (1974), Marvellous Méliès, London: Gordon Fraser, ISBN 0900406380
- Maine, David (30 September 2011), "A Mystery 100 Years in the Making: 'Paper Conspiracies'", PopMatters
- Malthête, Jacques; Mannoni, Laurent (2008), L'oeuvre de Georges Méliès, Paris: Éditions de La Martinière, ISBN 9782732437323
- Malthête, Jacques (2015), "Méliès et l'Affaire Dreyfus" (PDF), in Cosandey, Roland (ed.), Miscellanées Méliès, Cinémathèque suisse
