= The Devil in a Convent =

1899 film by Georges Méliès

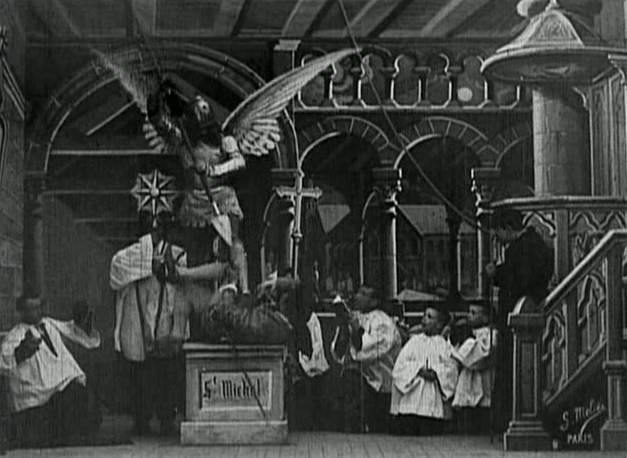
- Directed by: Georges Méliès
- Starring: Georges Méliès
- Production company: Star Film Company
- Release date: 1899
- Running time: 60 meters
- Country: France
- Language: Silent

The Devil in a Convent (1899) by Georges Méliès

The Devil in a Convent (French: Le Diable au couvent), released in the UK as "The Sign of the Cross", or the Devil in a Convent, is an 1899 French silent trick film directed by Georges Méliès.

== Themes ==
According to some film critics, The Devil in a Convent parodies monastic life, suggesting a satirical view of the Catholic Church. Méliès almost certainly agreed with the anti-ecclesiastic emotions prevalent during the Dreyfus affair in 1898 and 1899; Méliès supported Alfred Dreyfus's case, while the Church opposed it. Méliès made another religious satire, The Temptation of Saint Anthony, in the same year, as well as his strongly pro-Dreyfus film series The Dreyfus Affair.

== Production ==
The film may have been inspired in part by the phantasmagoria productions of the French magician Étienne-Gaspard Robert, known by the stage name "Robertson". Méliès himself plays the Devil in the film. The Devil in a Convent was likely the first Méliès film to take advantage of dissolves as a transition effect.

== Release ==
The Devil in a Convent was released by Méliès's Star Film Company and is numbered 185–187 in its catalogues, which also specified the film's three scenes (1. Les nonnes, le sermon. 2. Les démons, le sabbat. 3. Le clergé, l'exorcisme).

In 2010, the Cinémathèque Basque received a donation of a box of 35mm films, recovered by a private individual in 1995 from a garbage bin in Bilbao. The box was found to contain 32 films, including hand-colored prints of The Devil in a Convent and another 1899 Méliès film, The Mysterious Knight. Previously, these two films had only been available in black-and-white copies. The hand-colored print of The Devil in a Convent was judged to be in too advanced a state of decomposition to be restored completely; however, the third scene of the film was in good enough condition to be restored. Both films were entrusted to the Filmoteca de Catalunya for restoration, under the supervision of two Méliès scholars, Roland Cosandey and Jacques Malthête.
