= Divers at Work on the Wreck of the "Maine" =

1898 French silent film by Georges Méliès

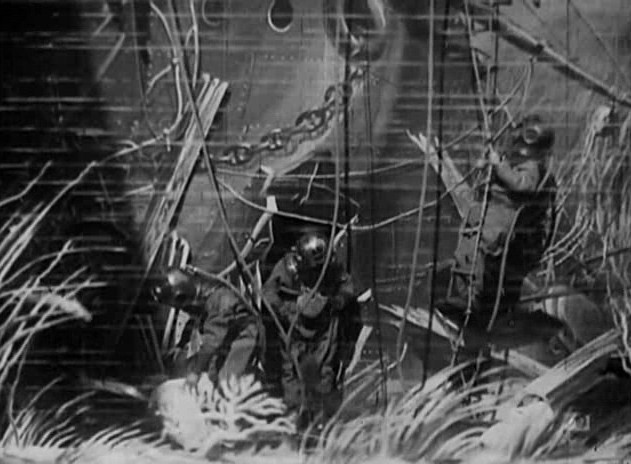
- A frame from the film
- Directed by: Georges Méliès
- Release date: 1898
- Running time: 20 meters (about 1 minute)
- Country: France
- Language: Silent film

Visite sous-marine du Maine, released in the United States as Divers at Work on the Wreck of the "Maine" and in Britain as Divers at Work on a Wreck Under Sea or Divers at Work on a Wreck Under Water, is an 1898 French short silent film by Georges Méliès.

== Synopsis ==
Divers at Work on the Wreck of the "Maine" (1898)

The sunken USS Maine lies at the bottom of Havana Harbor. Three divers in standard diving dress, with long air hoses connecting them to the unseen surface above, approach the wreck and retrieve a corpse. Tying a rope around the corpse's waist, they get it lifted to the surface as they continue exploring the wreck.

== Production ==
Divers at Work on the Wreck of the Maine was one of a series of four reconstructed actualities (actualités reconstituées) filmed by Méliès as illustrations of recent incidents in the Spanish–American War. The film is shot with an aquarium between the camera and the action, allowing real water and fish to be included in the frame; a painted gauze screen in front of the lens adds to the watery effect. The corpse is a mannequin.

As with his other reconstructed actualities, Méliès's visual style for the film was influenced by contemporary newspaper illustrations, which aimed to dramatize events as well as to make their details clear to the reader; another influence came from spectacular theatrical productions, where gauze and water tanks were often employed for nautical scenes. Méliès may have ended the film when he did partly for practical staging reasons: toward the end of the action, the divers' long air hoses begin to get tangled up with each other.

== Release and reception ==
Divers at Work on the Wreck of the Maine, alongside the other four films in Méliès's series about the Spanish-American War, was screened at Méliès's theatre of illusions, the Théâtre Robert-Houdin in Paris. The film was sold to other exhibitors by Méliès's Star Film Company and is numbered 147 in its catalogues, where it was advertised with the parenthetical subtitle plongeurs et poissons vivants ("divers and real fish"). In Britain, it was distributed by the Warwick Trading Company. The earliest known English-language release titles are Divers at Work on the Wreck of the "Maine" (for the United States) and Divers at Work on a Wreck Under Sea (for the United Kingdom); Divers at Work on a Wreck Under Water is another British title used for the film.

The film was the most successful entry in Méliès's Spanish–American War series; a French review on 1 May 1898 reported that the film was "of the greatest interest" (du plus vif intérêt). Méliès himself recalled in 1932 that the film was a crowdpleaser. The film was less successful in countries with no strong political interest in the Spanish–American War; when the film was shown in Sherbrooke in French Canada in June 1898, audiences responded negatively and asked for films they had seen about the Passion of Jesus to be shown again instead.

A print of the film survived in the collection of the Paisley Philosophical Institution in Scotland, and was donated to the National Film Library in London (now the BFI National Archive) in the 1930s. In a 1979 book on Méliès, film historian John Frazer praised the film's visual detail, commenting: "For persons without media sophistication, it would have been difficult not to believe in the veracity of this scene." In a 2000 analysis of Méliès's surviving works, film scholar Elizabeth Ezra highlighted the film's combination of an actuality format with a "coherent, if skeletal, narrative", as well as the film's realistic touches, "made to seem all the more authentic" by the contrasting presence of the obviously fake mannequin.
