= The Surrender of Tournavos =

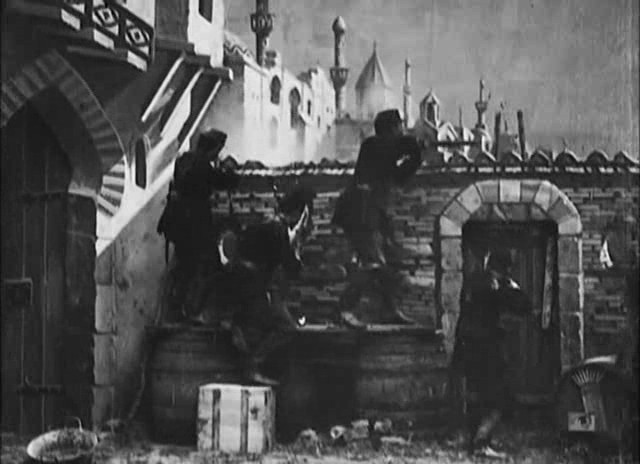
- A frame from the film
- Directed by: Georges Méliès
- Production company: Star Film Company
- Release date: 1897
- Running time: 59 feet (approx. 1 minute)
- Country: France
- Language: Silent

The Surrender of Tournavos (French: La Prise de Tournavos), also known as La Prise de Tournavos par les Troupes du Sultan, is an 1897 short silent film directed by Georges Méliès.

== Production ==
The Surrender of Tournavos (1897)

On 20–23 April 1897, in an early fight in the Greco–Turkish War of 1897, Greek and Turkish forces battled in the town of Tyrnavos (also spelled Turnavos or Tournavos) on the plain of Larissa. The Greeks were defeated and left the town. Méliès's film is a staged reconstruction of a scene in the battle.

The film was made on a set designed in Méliès's recognizable style. Though Méliès usually staged his actors in theatrically inspired blocking and filmed them from a frontal long shot viewpoint, the actors in The Surrender of Tournavos are staged more three-dimensionally, sometimes coming very near the camera.

== Release and survival ==
The Surrender of Tournavos is one of four reconstructed newsreels (actualités reconstituées) Méliès made in 1897 to illustrate recent events in the Greco–Turkish War of that year. It was released by Méliès's Star Film Company and is numbered 106 in its catalogues.

In the United Kingdom, the film was sold by the Warwick Trading Company, where it was advertised as Troopers Last Stand and described as "an incident of the Turko-Grecian war". Other exhibitors advertised it under different names: in June 1897 in Germany, Philipp Wolff advertised it as Capture of a House in Turnavos; in the United Kingdom, Wolff called it Turks Attacking a House Defended By Greeks (Turnavos); and in the United States in 1898, Eberhardt Schneider billed it as Defence of a House, Turco-Grecian War. A brief report in a British trade publication, Photograms of the Year, is the only known contemporary description of the film.

The film was presumed lost until 2007, when the film scholar Stephen Bottomore identified a surviving print in the collection of the National Film and Television Archive in London. A print also survives at the Centre national de la cinématographie.
