= The Temptation of Saint Anthony (film) =

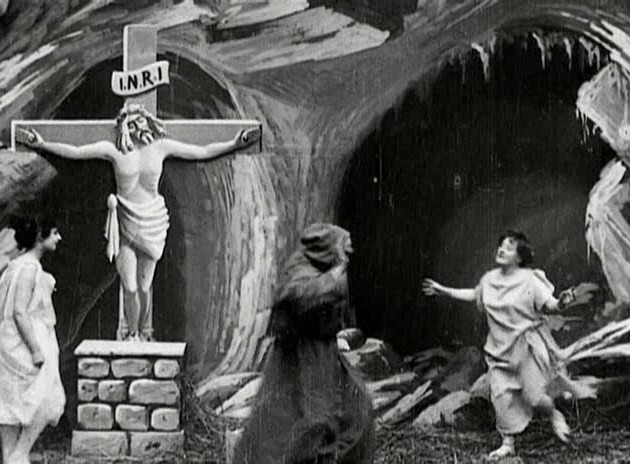
- A frame from the film
- Directed by: Georges Méliès
- Starring: Georges Méliès
- Production company: Star Film Company
- Release date: 1898
- Running time: 1 min 10 secs
- Country: France
- Language: Silent

The Temptation of Saint Anthony (French: Tentation de Saint Antoine) is an 1898 French silent trick film by Georges Méliès. The film, featuring Méliès and his frequent collaborator Jehanne d'Alcy, is a version of the traditional artistic subject of the temptation of Saint Anthony, showing Anthony the Great's faith and chastity tested by visions.

== Synopsis ==
Surviving print of the film

Saint Anthony's devotions in a cave are disrupted by sudden appearances from young women, whom he banishes in attempts to return to his prayer book. The saint kisses a skull relic only for it to transform into a woman, who is rejoined by the others to encircle him before vanishing. The saint kneels before an image of Jesus on the cross, only for this to transform into one of the women. He is finally saved by the appearance of an angel who returns all to normal.

== Production ==
The popular artistic subject of Saint Anthony's temptation had already been filmed in 1896 by Eugène Pirou, including the imagery in which the crucified Christ is transformed into a temptress. In Méliès's version, he himself plays Saint Anthony, and Jehanne d'Alcy appears as one of the three temptresses. The special effects are worked using multiple exposures and substitution splices. The cave backdrop is an early forerunner, in broad high-contrast brushwork, of the intricate grotto sets that feature in many later Méliès films.

== Themes ==
The Temptation of Saint Anthony is one of two Méliès films with a religious main theme; the other, The Devil in a Convent, was released the following year. Both films have a strong anti-clerical bent, with film historian John Frazer commenting that The Temptation "is interesting because of its satiric, even heretical overtones". Méliès almost certainly agreed with the anti-ecclesiastic emotions prevalent during the Dreyfus affair in 1898 and 1899; Méliès supported Alfred Dreyfus's case, accurately judging him to be innocent of his supposed crimes, while the Church opposed Dreyfus. Méliès's film series The Dreyfus Affair, made during the same period, likewise took a strongly pro-Dreyfus stance.

== Release ==
The Temptation of Saint Anthony was completed in the winter of 1898–1899. It was released by Méliès's Star Film Company and numbered 169 in its catalogues; the earliest English-language listing gives the title as Temptation of Saint Anthony, without an initial article. According to Méliès's later recollections, when the film was shown at one Paris fairground, the Foire du Trône on the Cours de Vincennes, the Prefect of Police took umbrage at the sacrilege and had the film removed from the bill.

== See also ==
- List of films about angels
