= The Coronation of Edward VII =

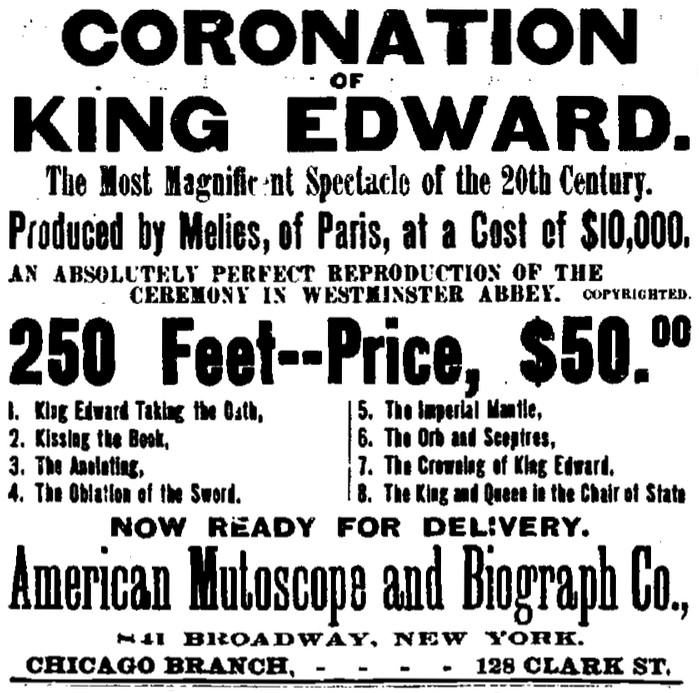
- American newspaper advertisement for the film
- Directed by: Georges Méliès
- Produced by: Charles Urban
- Cinematography: George Albert Smith
- Production company: Star Film Company
- Distributed by: Warwick Trading Company; Biograph Company
- Release date: August 9, 1902
- Running time: 107 meters; (approx. 6 minutes)

The Coronation of Edward VII (French: Le Sacre d'Édouard VII), also released as Reproduction, Coronation Ceremonies, King Edward VII and as Coronation of King Edward, is a 1902 short silent film directed by Georges Méliès and produced by Charles Urban. The film is a staged simulation of the coronation of King Edward VII and Queen Alexandra, produced in advance of the actual coronation for release on the same day.

Urban, after a failed attempt to obtain permission to film the actual ceremony, commissioned Méliès to direct the simulated version. The film, staged outdoors on a painted set, was planned as a realistic (albeit highly condensed) reproduction of the coronation; Urban procured various research details in England, while Méliès, at his French studio, cast his actors based on their resemblances to the real-life dignitaries at the ceremony. The film was completed on time for the coronation; when Edward fell ill, both the actual event and the release of the film were postponed.

The film premiered on Coronation Day to great popular success in Britain and elsewhere, although at least one journalist sharply criticized Urban and Méliès for faking the ceremony. King Edward himself was reportedly delighted with the film, and it remains one of Méliès' most well-received works.

== Summary ==
The Coronation of Edward VII (1902)

Edward VII and Alexandra of Denmark process into Westminster Abbey, where the king is administered the coronation oath and presented with a Bible to kiss. The king is anointed and crowned on King Edward's Chair by the Archbishop of Canterbury, Frederick Temple. The king and queen sit on thrones as all assembled pay their homage.

== Background ==
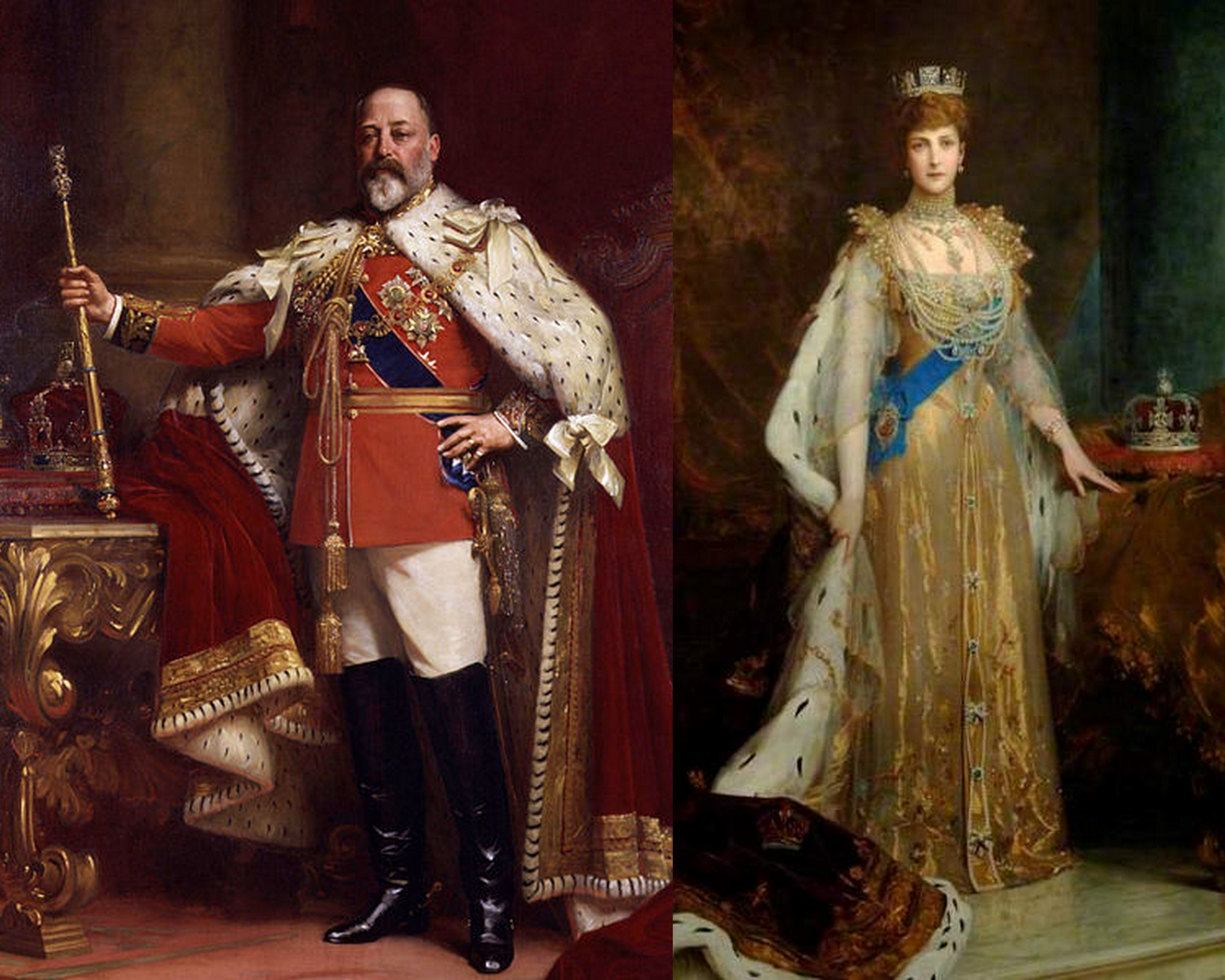
Paintings by Luke Fildes showing Edward and Alexandra in coronation robes

The reigning monarch of the United Kingdom, Queen Victoria, died on 22 January 1901, at which point her eldest son, Albert Edward, Prince of Wales, became King Edward VII. The coronation ceremony for Edward and his wife Alexandra, whom he had married in 1863, was scheduled for 26 June 1902.

The French filmmaker Méliès had already achieved acclaim with his innovative films Cinderella (1899) and Joan of Arc (1900), and in the summer of 1902 he was completing work on what would become his biggest success, the internationally popular A Trip to the Moon (1902). He had already filmed various "reconstructed newsreels," staged re-enactments of current events, and the year 1902 marked his three last works in the genre: The Eruption of Mount Pelee, The Catastrophe of the Balloon "Le Pax", and the last and most complex of all, The Coronation of Edward VII.

Urban, an American entrepreneur, had come to London as an agent for Thomas Edison, but had branched off from Edison in 1897 to become the director of the Warwick Trading Company. Urban was the London representative for Méliès's Star Film Company during Méliès's most fruitful period, and also occasionally distributed Méliès's films in the United States through the Biograph Company.

== Production ==
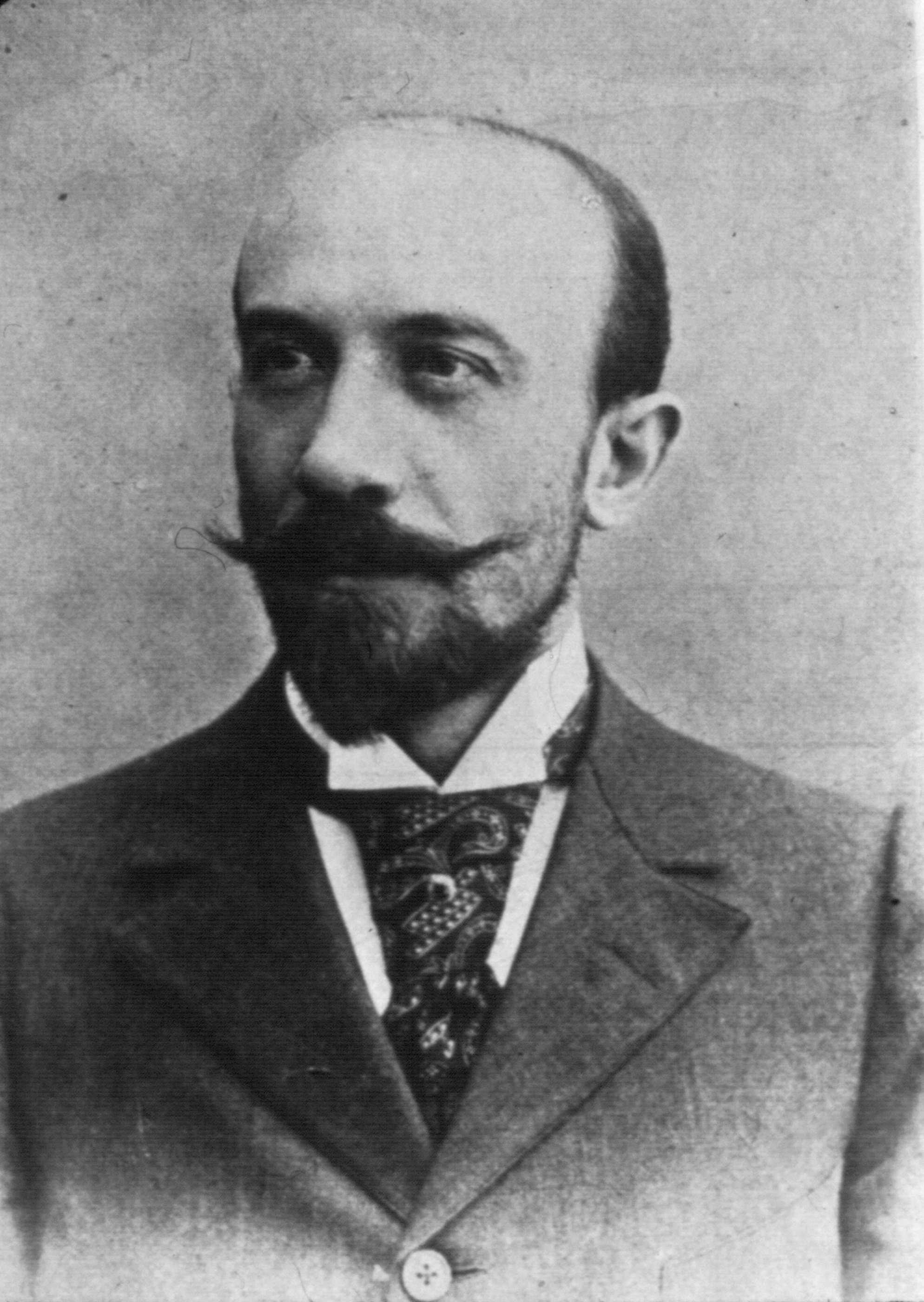
Méliès

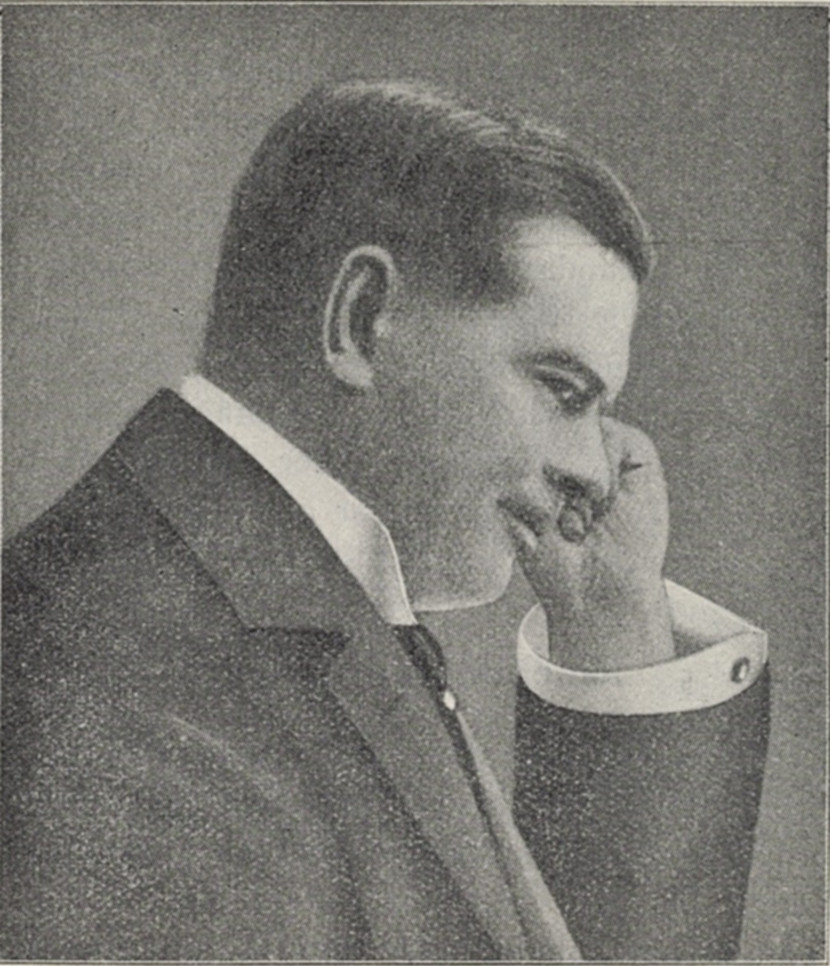
Urban

Urban was keen to film the actual coronation, but was denied permission; even if it had been given, Westminster Abbey would have been too dark to film in, and the camera would have been problematically noisy. Méliès and Urban decided to film a staged simulation of the event; it was agreed that Méliès would direct the film at his studio in Montreuil, Seine-Saint-Denis, while Urban would commission and finance the project.

Initially, Méliès considered the possibility of filming the ceremony in the unabashedly artificial theatrical style he used for his fantasy films; one idea, apparently suggested by Méliès to Urban in a letter, would have had the recently deceased Queen Victoria appear in a vision. However, Urban was intent on a more realistic "pre-enactment" of the ceremony to come. In a letter dated 26 May, he wrote to Méliès:

I have decided to … only produce the Coronation Ceremony and the one scene to last about 5 to 8 minutes. … I mentioned this matter to several high officials and they stated that if we do this well, that perhaps the King would command me to show it to him. It must therefore be your Masterpiece … Note: do not place your trade mark anywhere in the picture.

Urban obtained a detailed description of the ceremony's rituals from the royal protocol officer and passed it along to Méliès, as well as some photographs of the Abbey and various pieces of advice, such as:

The make-ups or impersonations must be perfect. In reality the King is several inches shorter than the Queen, but this must not show in the picture. The King is very sensitive on this point, and always wishes to appear slightly taller than the Queen.

Urban also visited Montreuil during production to check up on the work, and insisted that his own camera be used for filming. According to his recollections late in life, the British film pioneer George Albert Smith, a colleague of Urban's, traveled to Méliès's studio to operate the camera.

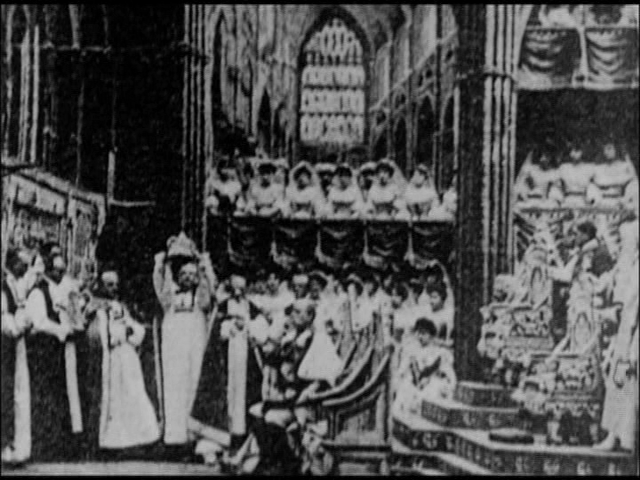
The archbishop raises the king's crown in a frame from the film

The film condensed the several hours of the ceremony into a single six-minute shot encompassing the most important moments. The production used about forty actors in all, chosen for their similarity to the figures they portrayed; Queen Alexandra was played by an actress from the Théâtre du Châtelet, and King Edward by a wash-house attendant from Le Kremlin-Bicêtre. (The same attendant later reprised his kingly role in Méliès's 1907 fantasy Tunnelling the English Channel.) Méliès's nephew Paul also made an appearance, as the attendant who bears the king's ceremonial sword.

Méliès, who may have traveled to Westminster Abbey to research the location for the film, designed and built an elaborate trompe-l'œil set, showing the north transept of the Abbey from the point of view of the crossing of the nave. He scaled down the proportions to fit the lens width available to him; nevertheless, the finished set was still too large for his studio, and was therefore set up outdoors, against the wall of his own garden in Montreuil. Méliès, never one to waste scenery, reused the thrones and armchairs built for the set in numerous later films, including Tunnelling the English Channel and The Palace of the Arabian Nights. Méliès filmed two takes of the coronation, one for British distribution by Warwick and one for American distribution by the Biograph Company; during the editing process, he swapped the endings of the two takes, probably to provide British viewers with the most accurate possible account of the ceremony. Later, when his studio set up an American office, Méliès took up the practice of filming two negatives simultaneously, one for domestic markets and one for copyright in New York.

== Release and reception ==
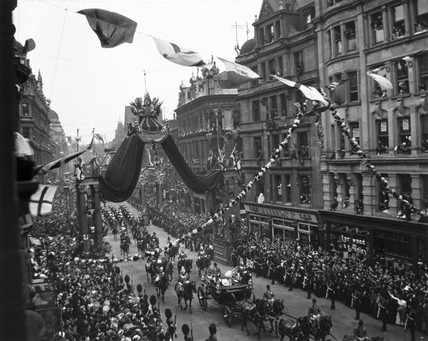
The coronation procession passes through London

The film was completed on 21 June, in time for the scheduled ceremony on the 26th. However, on the 24th, Edward was diagnosed with appendicitis. The disease carried a high mortality rate, and operations for it were not in common use, but surgery using recently developed techniques of anaesthesia and antisepsis was possible. Frederick Treves, supported by Joseph Lister, successfully treated the illness using the then-unconventional method of draining the abscess through an incision, and Edward's health began to return by the next day. With the king's life saved, the coronation was moved to 9 August.

The film was postponed accordingly, and premiered on the evening of Coronation Day at the Alhambra Theatre in London. Urban set up a camera at the actual coronation to capture the arrival and departure of the carriages before and after the ceremony, adding these shots to the beginning and end of Méliès's film to increase its verisimilitude. (The footage of the carriages is presumed lost, though a few stills from the arrival film survive in the BFI National Archive in London.) Because of Edward's fatigued recovery from illness, some parts of the ceremony shown in the film were omitted from the actual coronation.

Unlike most of Méliès's films, The Coronation of Edward VII was not advertised in the catalogues of his Star Film Company, but was sold by Urban's Warwick Trading Company, as well as by the Biograph Company under the alternative titles Reproduction, Coronation Ceremonies, King Edward VII and Coronation of King Edward. In all cases, it was not advertised as actual footage of the ceremony, but freely admitted to be a staged simulation of the event. It was accepted as such by the public, although one writer in the French illustrated journal Le Petit Bleu harshly criticized the film for being artificial:

Honorable Englishmen, they're fooling you! … Of course you will be shown something, but it will be—we need the right word—a put-on, a bluff, amateur theatrics. The Edward VII they'll show you solemnly on his throne, the Queen Alexandra, gracious and sober who will take her place at his side, will be walk-on players crowned at Montreuil, in a fake hall, decorated with painted canvas and furnished with cardboard armchairs!

The film was an immediate popular success, moving from headliner status at the Alhambra through the circuit of England's Empire Palace music halls and thence to distribution worldwide. In the United States, where the film was available a few days after the coronation, the showman Lyman H. Howe exhibited it together with other footage of London and of the Coronation Day parade to create a well-received long-form presentation. One American critic commented:

It seems almost incredible to believe that the photographer's art has reached a point where the detail work of such an important event as the coronation of a king can be so faithfully reproduced … For instance even the fibre of the beautiful and delicate draperies, the handsome costumes of the ladies, the elaborate decorations, are easily discernible.

Méliès used his share of the considerable profits from The Coronation of Edward VII to produce two additional major films the same year: Robinson Crusoe and Gulliver's Travels Among the Lilliputians and the Giants.

In complexity and notability, The Coronation of Edward VII remains second only to the multipart 1899 docudrama The Dreyfus Affair among Méliès's reconstructed newsreels. In their book-length studies of Méliès, John Frazer commented appreciatively on the film's "dignity and restraint," and Elizabeth Ezra highlighted the film's "interplay between fantasy and realism" inviting "viewers to question the distinction between the two representative modes." A few days after the coronation, the film was screened for Edward VII himself, who found the imitation ceremony delightful. He reportedly commented: "Many congratulations! This is splendid! What a marvellous apparatus cinema is. It's found a way of recording even the parts of the ceremony that didn't take place."
