= Marguerite de Pachmann =

Australian pianist (1864–1952)

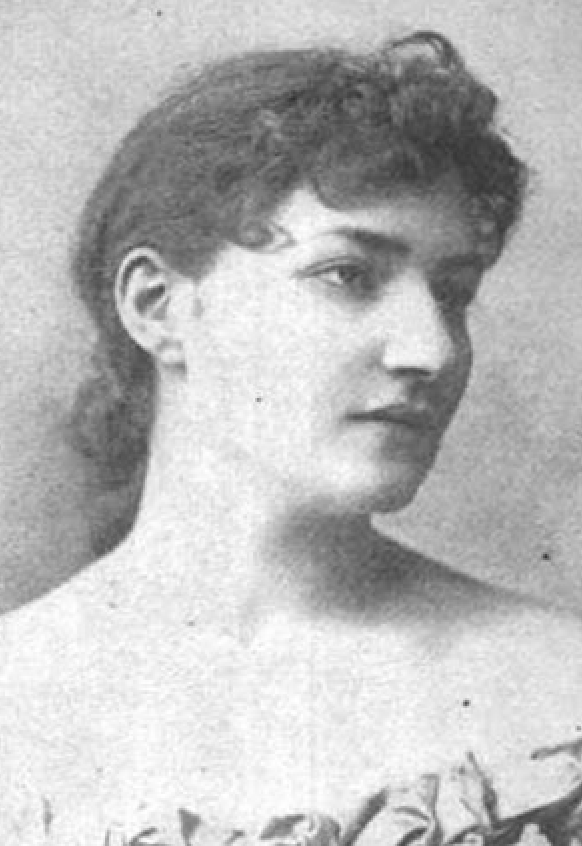
- Marguerite de Pachmann Labori, from a 1907 publication
- Born: Anna Louisa Margaret Okey; 14 December 1864; Pipeclay Diggings, New South Wales
- Died: 3 July 1952 (aged 87); Millery
- Other names: Marguerite de Pachmann-Labori, Margherita Labori
- Occupations: Pianist; composer; music educator
- Spouse(s): Vladimir de Pachmann; Fernand Labori
- Relatives: Prince Philip of Bourbon-Two Sicilies (son-in-law)

Marguerite de Pachmann Labori (14 December 1864 – 3 July 1952), born Anna Louisa Margaret Okey, was an Australian-born pianist, composer, and music educator. She married two famous men, Russian pianist Vladimir de Pachmann and French lawyer Fernand Labori.

== Early life ==
Anna Louisa Margaret Okey (or Oakey, or O'Key) was born in Pipeclay Diggings, New South Wales, the daughter of William Okey and Anna Maria King Blade Okey. She began learning to play the piano in Australia, but focused her training in England, while still a young child. She studied with Henry Wylde and Ferdinand Praeger at the Royal Academy of Music in London. In 1882, she heard Vladimir de Pachmann play in concert, and went to Germany to study with him. They married in London in 1884.

== Career ==
Okey began her professional music career in London, and touring in Britain. After marriage, she returned to performing in 1887, in Berlin. Also in 1887, she accompanied Lillian Nordica at the Crystal Palace. She toured in the United States in 1890, and again in 1892. She also composed; her compositions including a piano concerto in F minor, a sonata for violin and piano, and an opera, Yato (1913), which was produced in several cities. In widowhood after her second husband's death in 1917, she wrote and taught piano, and gave a rare recital in 1930 in London. In 1935, she published an edition of Chopin scores annotated according to Vladimir de Pachmann's method.

== Personal life ==
Okey married Vladimir de Pachmann in 1884; they had two sons together, Adrian and Leonide, before they divorced. Her second husband was a French lawyer and politician, Fernand Labori, known for his role in the Dreyfus affair. They had three daughters together, Violette, Denise, and Odette. Fernand Labori died in 1917. Odette Labori married Prince Philip of Bourbon-Two Sicilies as his second wife in 1927.

Marguerite de Pachmann Labori survived World War II in occupied France; she died in 1952, aged 87 years, in Millery. Her grave is in Montparnasse Cemetery. Houghton Library at Harvard University has a collection of Fernand and Marguerite Labori papers.
