= The Eruption of Mount Pelee =

1902 French film by Georges Méliès

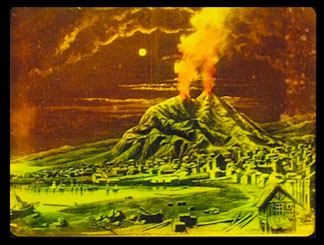
- A frame from the film
- Directed by: Georges Méliès
- Produced by: Georges Méliès
- Production company: Star Film Company
- Release date: 1902
- Country: France
- Language: Silent

Éruption volcanique à la Martinique, released in the United States as The Eruption of Mount Pelee and in Britain as The Terrible Eruption of Mount Pelée and Destruction of St. Pierre, Martinique, is a 1902 French short silent film directed by Georges Méliès. The film is a short reconstruction, using miniature models, of a recent historic event: the eruption on 8 May 1902 of Mount Pelée, which destroyed the town of Saint-Pierre, Martinique.

== Summary ==
Mount Pelée looms over the town of Saint-Pierre. Fire and smoke rises from the crater; then lava begins pouring down the sides of the mountain. The village is soon engulfed in smoke and flames.

== Production ==
The film is one of the most frequently cited examples of Méliès's "reconstructed newsreels," staged re-enactments of current events. The Eruption of Mount Pelee was his third-to-last work in the genre. It was followed by two others also made in 1902: The Catastrophe of the Balloon "Le Pax" and the most complex one of all, The Coronation of Edward VII. Stylistically, the film is reminiscent of the dioramas popular in the 19th century, which offered simulated views of places and events that would otherwise be inaccessible to spectators. Méliès's table-top miniature models recreate the eruption in a "storybook illustration" style highly indebted to Romanticism.

Academic opinion is divided on the exact method Méliès used to create the eruption. The Méliès descendant and film scholar Jacques Malthête hypothesized that a type of flare known as the Feu de Bengale was used (as Méliès did four years later to create an eruption of Mount Vesuvius in The Merry Frolics of Satan); film historians René Jeanne and Charles Ford nominated a flammable combination of cloth, colored water, cinders, and a kind of powdered chalk called Blanc d'Espagne; Méliès's granddaughter, Madeleine Malthête-Méliès, indicated that starch was poured down the model to simulate lava, and that pieces of paper and unseasoned wood were burned to create smoke; and the Méliès expert John Frazer suggested that the model was made of cardboard and paper and that "the eruption [was] created by a combination of flashing lights, powdered chalk, and cinders."

According to the film historian Pierre Lephrohon, the poet Guillaume Apollinaire once asked Méliès himself how he made The Eruption of Mount Pelee. Méliès said simply: "By photographing cinders and chalk." Apollinaire remarked to a friend who was with them: "Monsieur and I have the same occupation, we enchant ordinary materials."

== Release and other versions ==
The Eruption of Mount Pelee was released by Méliès's Star Film Company and is numbered 397 in its catalogues. Two other filmmakers contemporary with Méliès, Ferdinand Zecca and Thomas Edison, produced their own miniature-model reconstructions of the Pelée eruption. Zecca's version, produced in May 1902 as Catastrophe de la Martinique (number 544 in the Pathé Frères catalogue), used four stagehands to create the eruption effect: one burning sulfur behind the model mountain, another pouring down smoke from a ladder off screen, a third on another ladder throwing down handfuls of sawdust to represent cinders, and a fourth agitating the miniature sea and raising the water level to suggest a tidal wave. The film historian Georges Sadoul notes that Zecca's version aims for academic realism in its style, creating an effect markedly different from Méliès's deliberately Romanticized portrayal.

The Edison Manufacturing Company version was released in three parts: Mt. Pelee Smoking Before Eruption (St. Pierre, Martinique), Mt. Pelee in Eruption and Destruction of St. Pierre (Martinique), and Burning of St. Pierre (Martinique). The Edison Company had sent the photographer J. Blair Smith to Martinique to film the aftermath of the accident; meanwhile, the filmmaker Edwin S. Porter stayed at the Edison studio in Orange, New Jersey to recreate the eruption using a studio model. A dozen clips of Smith's real-life footage, and all three of Porter's films simulating different stages of the eruption, were sold by the Edison Company in July 1902; the catalogue encouraged exhibitors to combine the real and faked films to "make a complete show in themselves." According to the film historian Lewis Jacobs, the crew that created the Edison version found their own unique way to simulate the eruption: they exposed a barrel of beer to direct sunlight and waited for it to explode.

The Eruption of Mount Pelee was presumed lost for many years; a film in the collection of the Cinémathèque Française was sometimes misidentified as Méliès's film, but it was in fact Zecca's version. Méliès's film was finally recovered in 2007, when a copy was found and restored by the Filmoteca de Catalunya.
