= Augusto Severo de Albuquerque Maranhão =

Brazilian politician, journalist, inventor and aeronaut

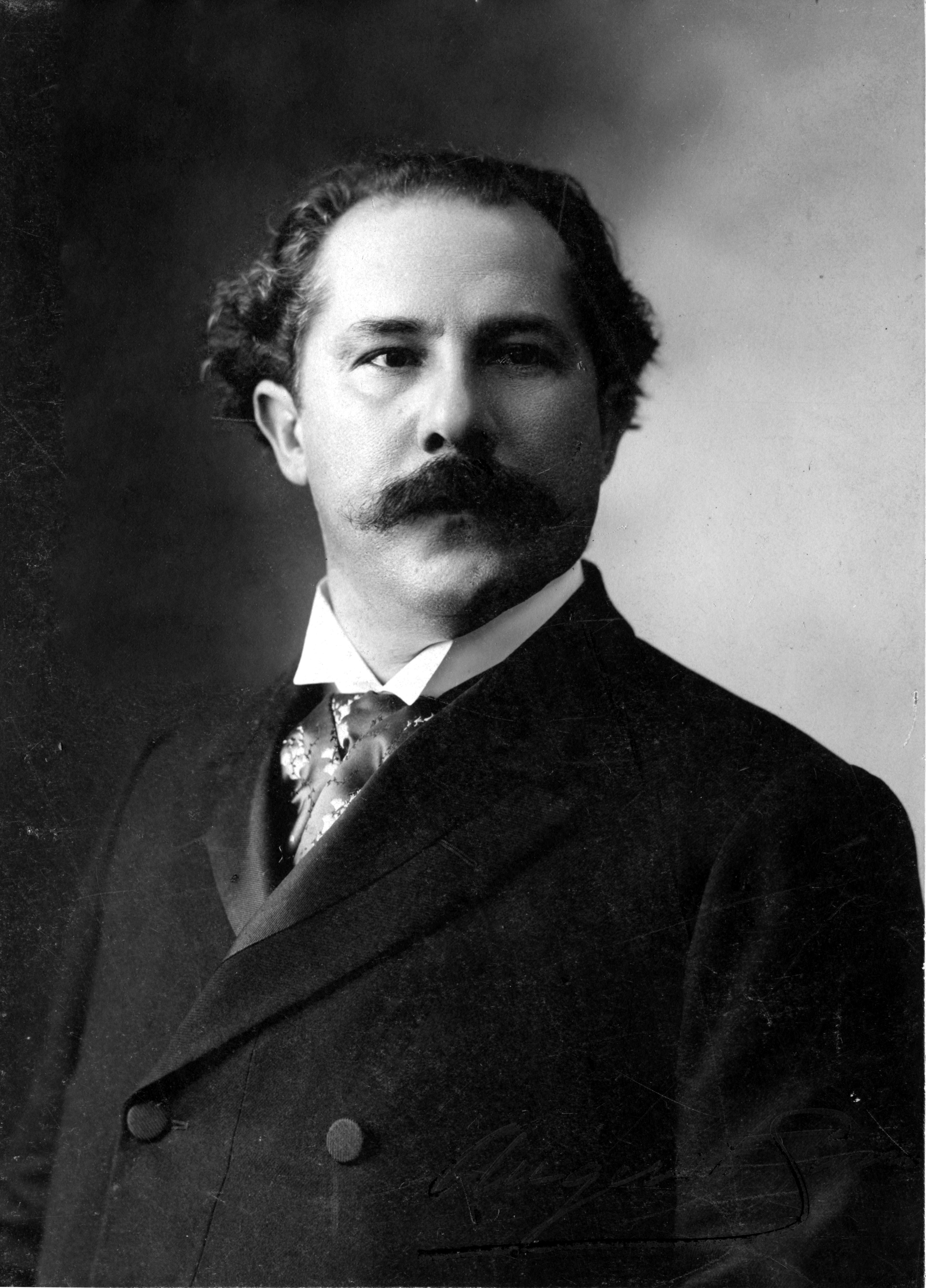
- Born: 11 January 1864; Macaíba, Brazil
- Died: 12 May 1902 (aged 38); Paris, France
- Cause of death: Pax airship disaster
- Occupations: Aviator, inventor

Augusto Severo's Pax airship, 1902

Augusto Severo de Albuquerque Maranhão (11 January 1864 – 12 May 1902) was a Brazilian politician, journalist, inventor and aeronaut.

Severo was born in Macaíba. He died on 12 May 1902, together with his French mechanic, Georges Saché, when they were flying over Paris in an airship called Pax. A marble plaque at number 81 of the Avenue du Maine in Paris, commemorates the location of Augusto Severo accident. The Catastrophe of the Balloon "Le Pax" is a 1902 short silent film recreation of the wreck.
