= The Catastrophe of the Balloon "Le Pax" =

- Directed by: Georges Méliès
- Production company: Star Film Company
- Release date: 1902

Augusto Sévéro's Pax Airship, 1902

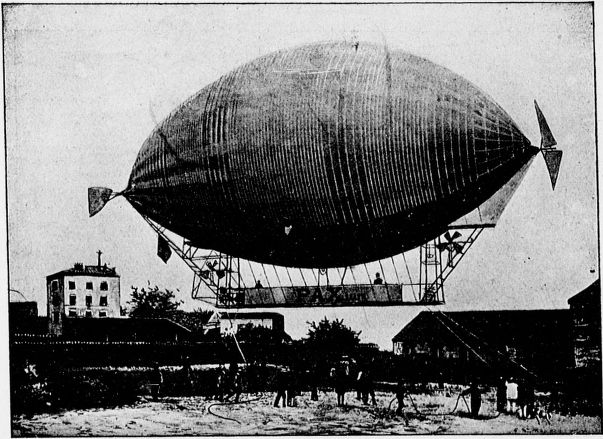
The dirigible Pax

The Catastrophe of the Balloon "Le Pax" (French: Catastrophe du Ballon 'Le Pax') is a 1902 short silent film directed by Georges Méliès. It was released by Méliès's Star Film Company and is numbered 398 in its catalogues.

The film is a recreation of a real-life catastrophe that occurred in Paris on 12 May 1902. At 5 a.m. on that day, the Brazilian inventor Augusto Severo de Albuquerque Maranhão and his mechanic, M. Georges Saché, set off in Severo's dirigible, the Pax. They intended to fly from Paris to Issy-les-Moulineaux. However, while the aeronauts were still over Paris at about 400 meters' altitude, the motor stopped and the dirigible exploded. Both Severo and Saché were killed.

The Catastrophe of the Balloon "Le Pax" is the second-to-last of Méliès's "reconstructed newsreels" (staged re-enactments of current events), made between The Eruption of Mount Pelee and The Coronation of Edward VII. It is currently presumed lost.

== See also ==
- List of lost films
