= Vladimir de Pachmann =

Russian pianist (1848–1933)

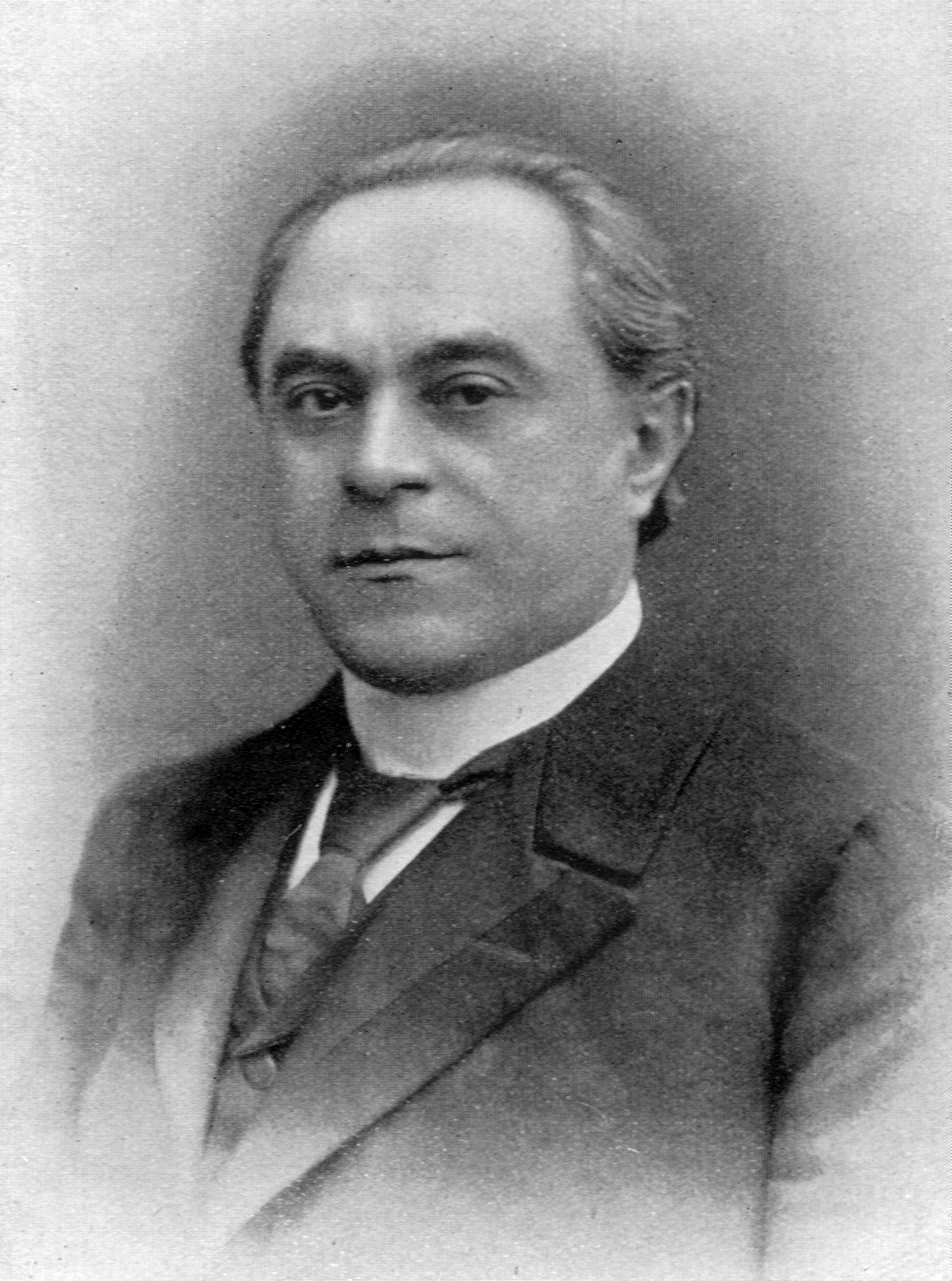
Vladimir Pachmann

Vladimir de Pachmann or Pachman (27 July 1848 – 6 January 1933) was a Russian pianist of German descent. He is known for performing the works of Chopin and for his eccentric performing style.

== Biography ==
He was born Vladimir Pachmann in Odessa, Russian Empire; the nobiliary particle (von or de) in his name was probably his own idea. Three of his brothers serving as officers in the Imperial Russian Army did not use the particle.

His father was a professor at the University of Odessa and a celebrated amateur violinist who had met Beethoven, Weber and other notable composers in Vienna. He was his son's only teacher until he turned 18, at which time he went to Vienna to study music at the Vienna Conservatory, studying piano with Josef Dachs (a pupil of Carl Czerny) and theory with Anton Bruckner. He gained the Conservatory's Gold Medal and made his concert debut in Odessa in 1869, but until 1882 he appeared in public infrequently, spending his time in further study. He then toured throughout Europe and the United States, and was acclaimed as a top player of his era. His programmes consisted almost exclusively of the works of Chopin, with only an occasional movement by Bach, Scarlatti, Mendelssohn or Henselt.

In Denmark he was appointed a Knight of the Order of the Dannebrog.

For the eighteen years from 1890 to 1908, he toured across the United States, beginning and ending in New York. During that period of touring he promoted Chickering pianos.

Pachmann was one of the earliest performers to make recordings, beginning in 1906 with mechanical recordings for the Welte-Mignon reproducing piano and in 1907 for the gramophone.

He became famous for gesturing, muttering and addressing the audience during his performances; the Encyclopædia Britannica Eleventh Edition characterized it as the "playfulness of his platform manner". Critic James Huneker called him the "Chopinzee", and George Bernard Shaw reported that he "gave his well-known pantomimic performance, with accompaniments by Chopin".

In April 1884 Pachmann married the Australian-born British pianist Maggie Okey (Annie Louisa Margaret Okey, 1865–1952), who was later known as Marguerite de Pachmann. They did concert tours of Europe together and had three sons – Victor (who died in infancy), Adriano, and Leonide (called Lionel). The marriage ended after seven years.

Vladimir de Pachmann died in Rome in 1933, aged 84.

== Sources ==
- Chisholm, Hugh, ed. (1911). "Pachmann, Vladimir de" . Encyclopædia Britannica. Vol. 20 (11th ed.). Cambridge University Press. p. 433.
