= Edgar Demange =

French jurist (1841–1925)

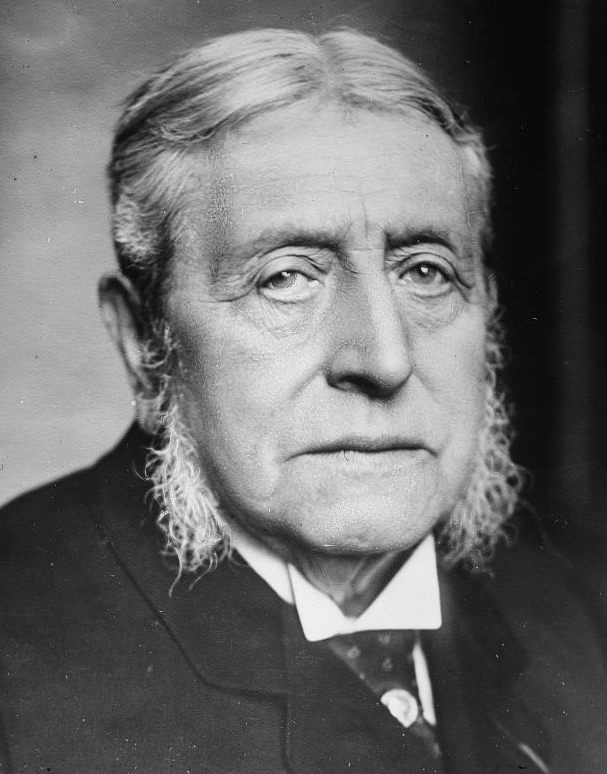
Edgar Demange

Edgar Demange (April 22, 1841 in Versailles – February 1925 in Paris) was a French jurist. He was, with Fernand Labori, the lawyer of Alfred Dreyfus during his trials in 1894 and 1899.

== Biography ==
Demange was a winner of the national eloquence competition. He became famous by winning the acquittal of prince Pierre Bonaparte, the killer of the Republican Victor Noir in 1870. A specialist in criminal law, he was recognized by his peers and elected a member of the Council of the Order from 1882 to 1892. Demange and Labori failed to win the acquittal of Captain Alfred Dreyfus at either of his trials, but Dreyfus was eventually pardoned by the French President and rehabilitated at the end of the long Dreyfus Affair.
