= The Mysterious Knight =

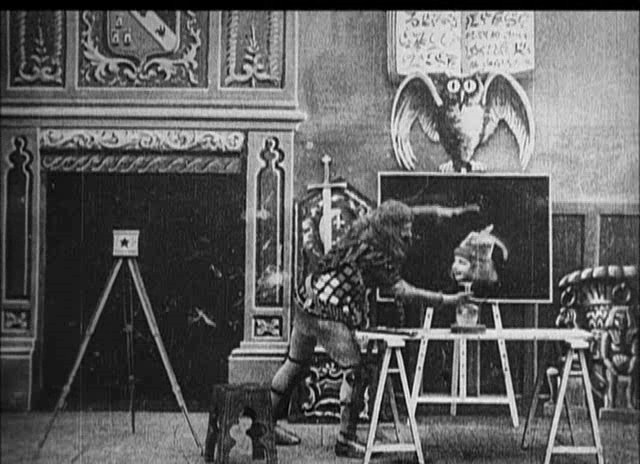
- A frame from the film
- Directed by: Georges Méliès
- Production company: Star Film Company
- Release date: 1899
- Running time: 40 meters (approx. 2 minutes)
- Country: France
- Language: Silent

The Mysterious Knight (French: Le Chevalier mystère) is an 1899 French silent trick film directed by Georges Méliès.

== Themes ==
The Mysterious Knight (1899)

The Mysterious Knight is a trick film in which motifs from the European Medieval period are used satirically as a setting for cinematic special effects. This was one of two Medieval-themed genres in the silent cinema, both of which were developed and codified by Méliès himself; the other was a less overtly whimsical, more plot-oriented genre of narrative film telling medieval stories, such as Méliès's 1900 epic Joan of Arc. Both types of Medieval film invented by Méliès were extensively influential, quickly spreading to the United States and other filmmaking countries. The medieval trick film genre was a particularly decisive influence, leading eventually to the development of animated medieval films as well as to medieval epics that use computer-generated imagery for spectacular purposes.

The film is also one of many Méliès works featuring living body parts becoming detached from the rest of the body. Other examples include The Man with the Rubber Head, The Infernal Cake Walk, and The Melomaniac.

== Production ==
The special effect of the talking head in a vase was created using multiple exposure, with the film stock was rewound in the camera and reexposed. Black cloth was used to mask the set when the head was filmed. Méliès performed a similar trick, with three duplications of his own head, in his film The Four Troublesome Heads.

== Release and survival ==
The film was released by Méliès's Star Film Company and is numbered 226–227 in its catalogues. It was presumed lost until a print was identified in the vaults of the George Eastman House. In 1989, a restored print of the film was premiered at the Pordenone Silent Film Festival.
