= Pax airship disaster =

Explosion of an experimental hydrogen airship in 1902

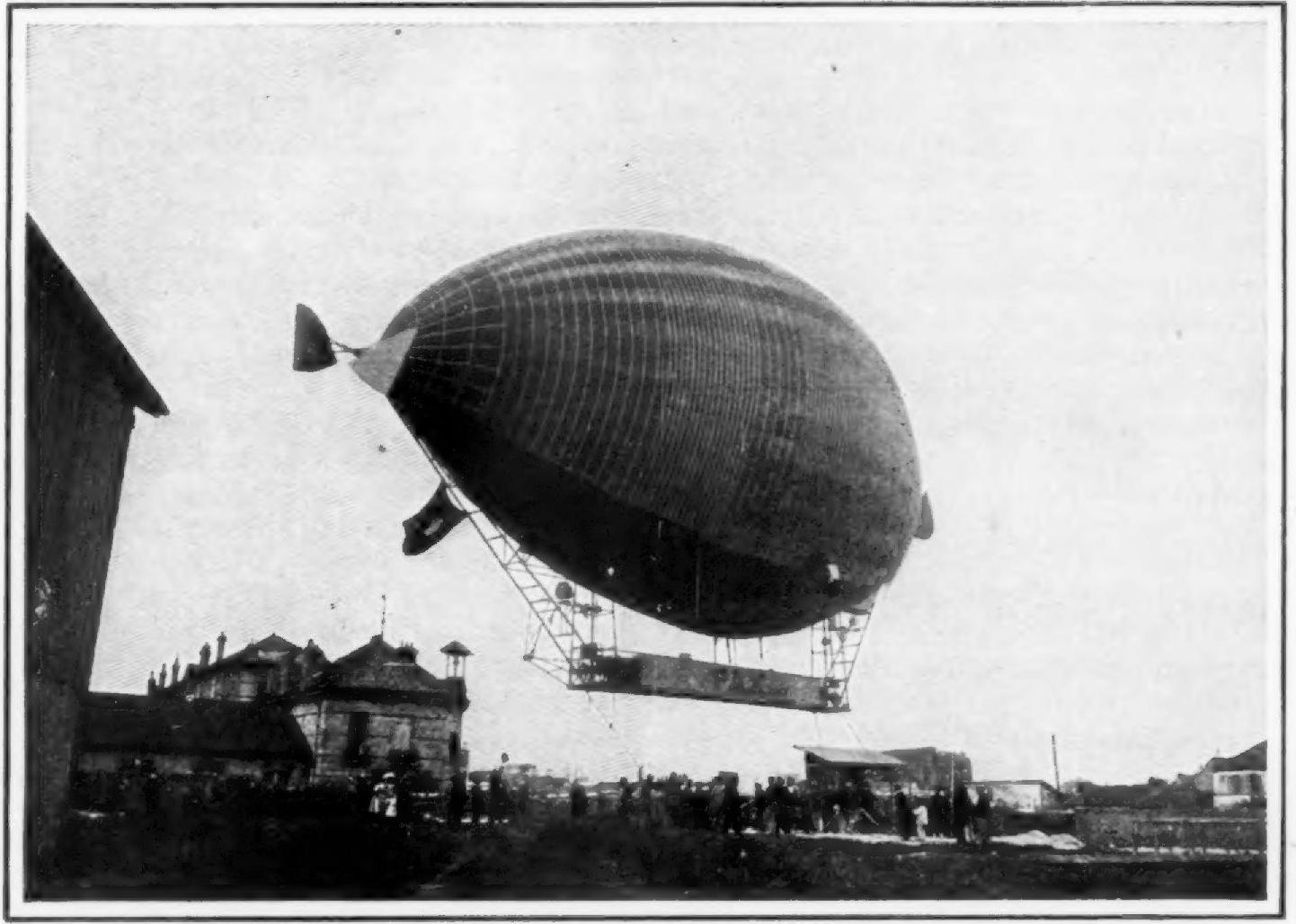

Accident
- Date: 12 May 1902
- Summary: Explosion of an experimental airship due to the proximity of the gasoline engine to the hydrogen envelope

Aircraft
- Aircraft type: Airship
- Aircraft name: Pax
- Flight origin: Paris, France
- Destination: Issy-les-Moulineaux, France
- Occupants: 2
- Crew: 2
- Fatalities: 2
- Survivors: 0

The Pax airship disaster was the explosion of the Pax airship on May 12, 1902, in Paris, which killed the Brazilian inventor Augusto Severo and the French mechanic Georges Saché.

== History ==
=== Background ===
The fusiform-shaped Pax airship had a capacity of 2,000 cubic meters, a length of 30 metres (98 ft), a nacelle of 30 metres (98 ft), and weighed 2,000 kilograms (4,400 lb). Its inventor, Augusto Severo, had already been studying aeronautics for 20 years and invested all the rest of his fortune in Pax. The airship was originally intended to have an electric motor, but due to the time it would have taken to develop it and an obligation to return to Brazil to fulfill his parliamentary term, Severo was convinced to follow the example of Santos Dumont and adopt gasoline engines, although he was hesitant about their usage even five days before the flight.

The Pax was completed a fortnight before the accident, with experiments being conducted in an Earth-tethered manner and in a complicated weather situation on May 4 in Vaugirard park, with satisfactory results, which led the inventor to proceed with a crewed flight.

In the following days, unfavourable weather made further experiments difficult, but at midnight on May 12 Severo began filling the balloon, complete at 5 a.m. Before starting the flight, Severo announced that Brazil would learn of his success on the anniversary of the Golden Law and presented plans for the airship Jesus, which was to be 100 meters long and with which he intended to cross the Atlantic. As a way of saving weight, Severo left Alvaro Reis on the ground, going up only with his mechanic, 28-year-old Georges Sachet, who had never made an ascent before.

For twenty minutes, Severo flew with the airship tethered to the ground, testing its maneuverability. He then landed, conversed with friends and family, and at 5:25 in the morning resumed his flight. No longer on a tether, Severo soon struggled to maintain controlled flight. The airship shed ballast thrice, rose to 350 metres (1,150 ft), but had difficulties fighting the wind, making circles of 100 metres (330 ft) to 150 metres (490 ft) in diameter. Severo fought to remain in control of the airship for fifteen minutes, but the 40 hp engine was not powerful enough in these conditions.

=== Explosion ===
The airship Pax exploded at 5:40 a.m. on May 12, 1902, with its wreckage falling onto Maine Avenue, killing both occupants.

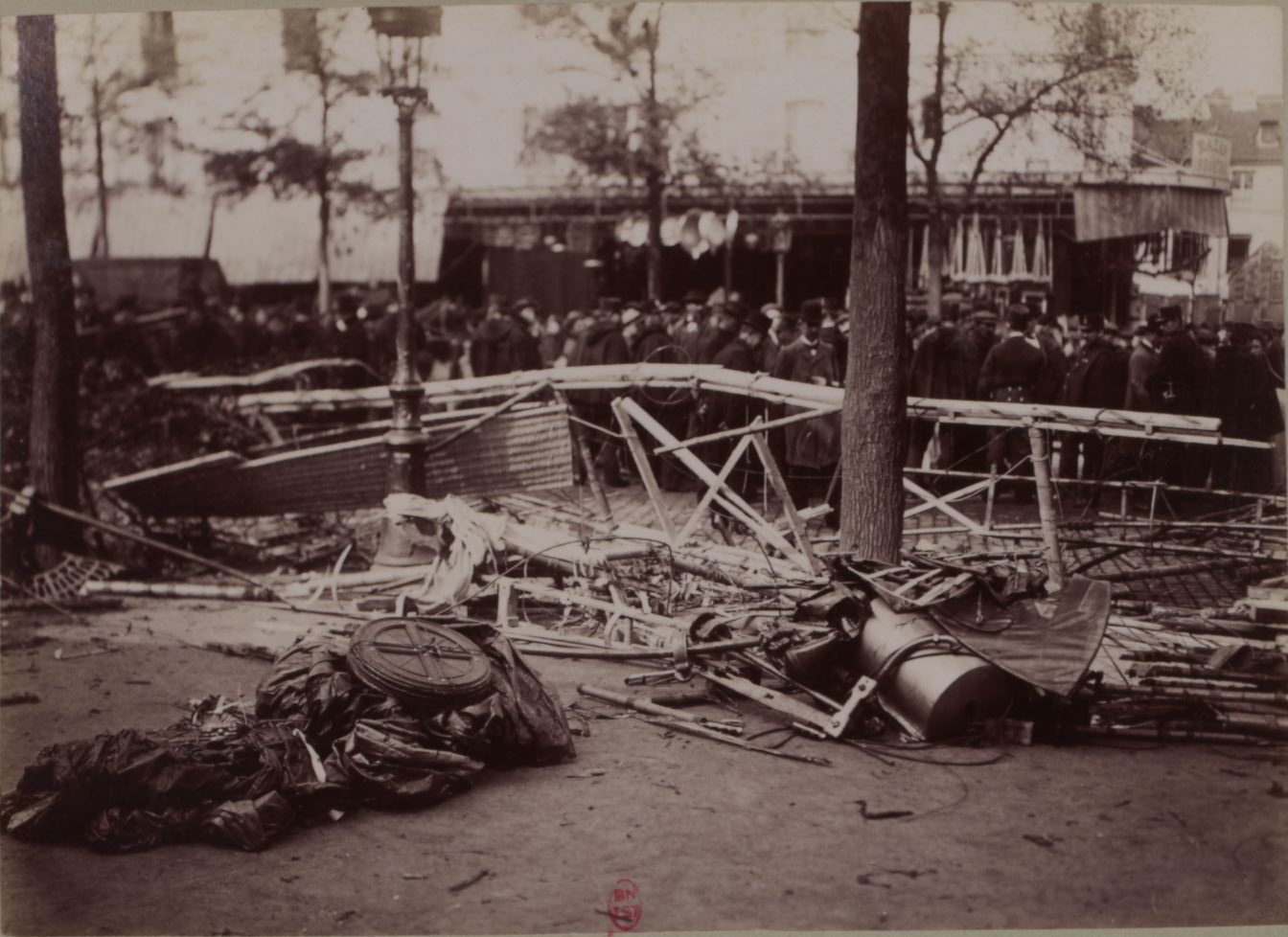
The wreckage of the airship

The flames first erupted from the engine, soon enveloping the entire aircraft. The wreckage fell in front of house n. 79, on Maine Avenue, with the nacelle where the aeronauts were located crashing through the ceiling and coming to a stop inside a couple's bedroom. The bed was located on the opposite side of the room, which saved the lives of the residents who were sleeping at the time.

==== Cause of the accident ====
Colonel Rénard, soon after the explosion, opined that the accident was caused by the use of the combustion engine. Henri Lachambre believed that the mechanical parts had been twisted and the fire had gone from the carburetor to the reservoir and from there to the gas exhaust valve. Astronomer Albert Charbonneaux, from the Meudon observatory, investigated the wreckage and, among other things, pointed to a short circuit in the engine's electrical part as the cause of the disaster.

Santos Dumont considered it imprudent to place the engines so close to the balloon, but initially said he didn't believe they were the cause of the accident. He pointed out that only one of the two valves above the second engine was working. Santos Dumont pointed out that a valve was closed with wax by the aeronaut and that, under flight conditions, the balloon was unable to withstand the internal pressure, and that the main error was that they dropped ballast when they noticed that the airship was rising, which allowed the aircraft to climb with more speed.

In an article published in September of the same year, Santos Dumont pointed out that the engine was a mere three feet from the envelope, which made the aircraft accident-prone. The Scientific Committee of the French Aeroclub finally decided that the accident was caused by the proximity of the engine to the balloon's exhaust valve and that under these conditions, Pax would have not be accepted into the Aeroclub's competitions.

=== Consequences ===
Severo died seconds after impact. Both aeronauts suffered extremely violent injuries. Augusto Severo's body was taken from the hangar to his home at 9 a.m. that same day, while that of Sachet remained at the police station until his mother arrived.

The vicinity of the wreckage was soon surrounded by spectators. Commander Rénard carried the remains of the airship back to the hangar, after fifty police officers had closed the streets. Alfredo Maia, former Minister of Transportation, telegraphed President Campos Salles, asking that Congress vote on Severo's funeral and grant a pension to his widow. The entire French aviation community went to the crash site and a committee from the French Aeroclub brought their condolences to Augusto Severo's widow.

Before its transport to Brazil, the coffin was buried at the Passy cemetery in Paris on May 17, 1902. Augusto Severo's body arrived in Rio de Janeiro on June 17, and was buried the next day, with the participation of President Campos Salles. His hangar in Paris passed to Baron de Bradsky, another balloonist.

== Legacy ==
In September 1902, it was decided to name two streets in Brazil after the aeronauts. The following year a tombstone was placed at the site of the accident and a bust of Severo was placed in the cemetery in Paris. The accident was depicted in the short film The Catastrophe of the Balloon "Le Pax" by director Georges Méliès. In 1903 a memorial service for the victims took place in Paris. In 1952 a tribute was held by friends of the Brazilian inventor in his memory. In 2019 a bill was introduced to inscribe his name in the Book of Heroes of the Fatherland. 120 years after his death, in 2022, Augusto Severo's remains were transported from Rio de Janeiro to Rio Grande do Norte, his birthplace.

== Bibliography ==
(Organized by date)

- Lisboa, Silvia (1901-12-01). "De Paris". Jornal do Brasil (in Brazilian Portuguese). Vol. 11, no. 335. p. 1.
- "A opinião d'"A Tribuna"". A Republica (in Brazilian Portuguese). Vol. 14, no. 119. 1902-06-06. p. 4.
- C, N. de (1902-06-07). "A morte de Severo (Conclusã )". Diario do Maranhão (in Brazilian Portuguese). Vol. 33, no. 8642. pp. 2–3.
- "Explosão do Pax!". Diário de Pernambuco (in Brazilian Portuguese). Vol. 78, no. 128. 1902-06-08. p. 1.
- "Explosão do Pax!". Diário de Pernambuco (in Brazilian Portuguese). Vol. 78, no. 130. 1902-06-11.
- "A noticia do "Figaro" sobre a catastrophe do "Pax"". Estado do Espirito Santo (in Brazilian Portuguese). Vol. 21, no. 141. 1902-06-18. p. 2.
- "Augusto Severo". O Contemporaneo (in Brazilian Portuguese). Vol. 9, no. 8. 1902-06-22. p. 2.
- Caye, Georges (1902-06-25). "O Drama do "Pax" (I)". A Republica (in Brazilian Portuguese). Vol. 14, no. 130. p. 1.
- Caye, Georges (1902-06-26). "O Drama do "Pax" (II)". A Republica (in Brazilian Portuguese). Vol. 14, no. 131. p. 1.
- Caye, Georges (1902-06-27). "O Drama do "Pax" (III)". A Republica (in Brazilian Portuguese). Vol. 14, no. 132. p. 1.
- "O enterro de Augusto Severo em Paríz". A Republica (in Brazilian Portuguese). Vol. 14, no. 132. 1902-06-27. p. 1.
- "Augusto Severo e a Imprensa Extrangeira". A Republica (in Brazilian Portuguese). Vol. 14, no. 152. 1902-07-22. p. 1.
- Santos-Dumont, Alberto (September 1902). "How I Became an Aëronaut and My Experience with Air-Ships". McClure's Magazine. Vol. 19, no. 5. pp. 454–464.
- "Col. 5". O Contemporaneo (in Brazilian Portuguese). Vol. 9, no. 15. 1902-11-14. p. 1.
- "Homenagem à Augusto Severo". A Federação (in Brazilian Portuguese). Vol. 19, no. 237. 1902-10-11. p. 2.
- "Paris, 11 de Maio". Jornal do Recife (in Brazilian Portuguese). Vol. 47, no. 106. 1903-05-12. p. 1.
- Lisboa, Silvia (1903-06-07). "De Paris". Jornal do Brasil (in Brazilian Portuguese). Vol. 13, no. 158. p. 2.
- "Meio Centenário do Falecimento de Augusto Severo". Diario da Tarde (in Brazilian Portuguese). Vol. 54, no. 17.578. 1952-03-21. p. 1.
- Motta, Rafael. "PROJETO DE LEI N.º 5.244, DE 2019". Senado Federal (in Brazilian Portuguese). p. 4.
- "120 anos após explosão do dirigível Pax em Paris, restos mortais de Augusto Severo chegam ao RN". G1 (in Brazilian Portuguese). 2022-12-16.
