= Georges Sadoul =

French cinema writer (1904–1967)

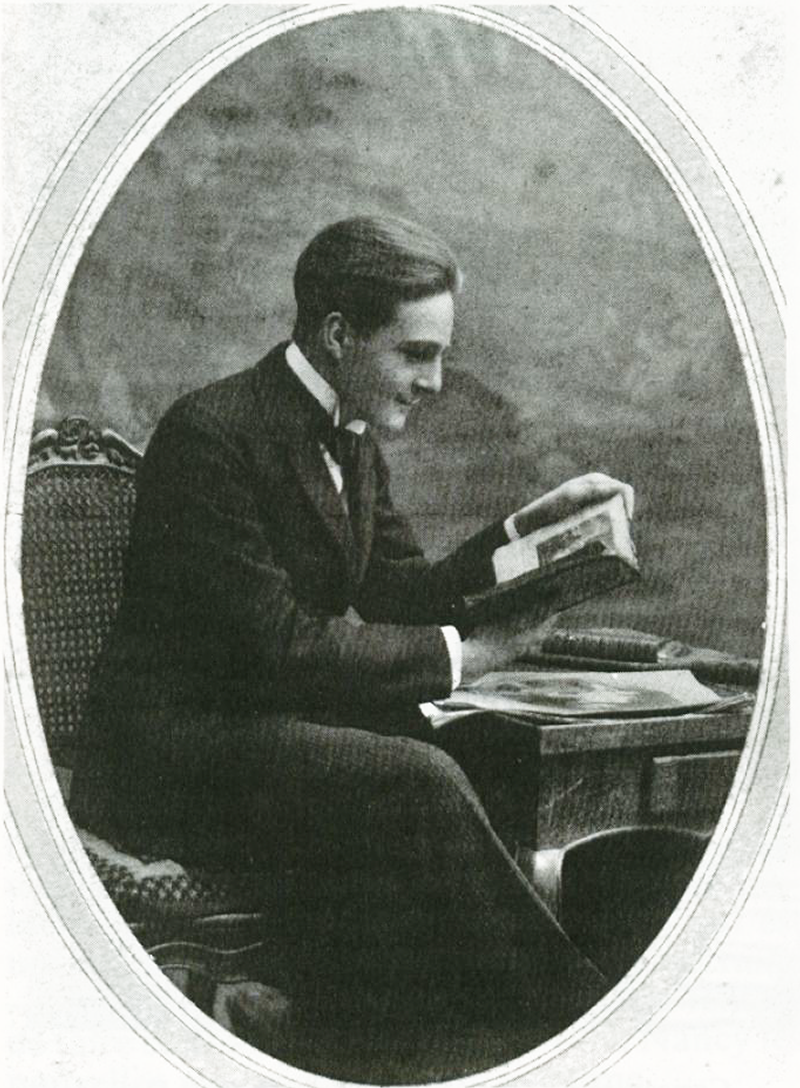
- Portrait of a young Georges Sadoul
- Born: 4 February 1904; Nancy, France
- Died: 13 October 1967 (aged 63); Paris, France
- Occupations: Journalist; writer; film historian
- Organization(s): University of Paris, Sorbonne; IDHEC

Georges Sadoul (French: [ʒɔʁʒ sadul]; 4 February 1904 – 13 October 1967) was a French film critic, journalist and cinema writer. He is known for writing encyclopedias of film and filmmakers, many of which have been translated into English.

== Biography ==
Sadoul was born in Nancy. His father, Charles Sadoul, was a well-known ethnologist.

At the age of 19, a student in Nancy, he collaborated with L'Est Républicain and founded the Nancy-Paris Committee. The objective of this committee is to allow the population of Nancy to meet Parisian productions and artists. He notably brought there Jean Epstein, Henry Prunières, André Lurçat, Jacques Rivière, Jacques Copeau and André Lhote.

Once a surrealist, he became a member of the French Communist Party in 1932. He was editor-in-chief of the magazine for young people, published by the PCF, Mon Camarade. He was responsible for the cinematographic section of the journal Regards, from 1936. Until the war, he published articles regularly in L'Humanité and the Cahiers du bolchévisme.

In his Diary of war, he recounts at length his phoney war and the debacle of 1940.

Sadoul was also a member of the Resistance, alongside Louis Aragon, and responsible for the Front National des Intellectuels for the southern zone from 1941 to 1944. He collaborated with the clandestine Les Letters Françaises and the Stars.

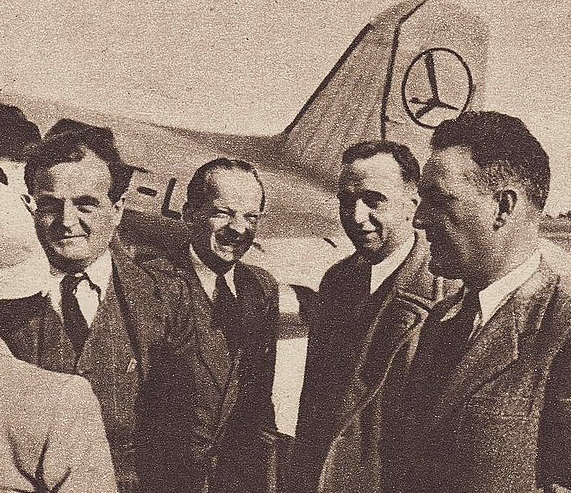
Georges Sadoul (on the left), French government official Dieterle, Fourre Cormeray and director Jean Grémillon (on the right) at Okęcie airport in Warsaw, 1947.

After the Second World War he published in six volumes his main work General History of Cinema ("Histoire générale du cinéma"). He viewed films around the world with a focus on developing countries. Throughout his career, Sadoul was accused of having an ideological bias in his works.

He taught cinema history at the IDHEC, and also taught at the Sorbonne's Institut de filmologie.

He was the first secretary general of the French Federation of Film Clubs and the International Federation of Film Clubs. He published of some of the most important reviews of the era in magazines such as Cahiers du Cinéma. He died in Paris at the age of sixty-three.

== Bibliography ==
- Histoire générale du cinéma. Tome 1. L'invention du cinéma (1832–1897), Denoël, 1946
- Histoire générale du cinéma. Tome 2. Les pionniers du cinéma, Denoël, 1950–1975
- Histoire générale du cinéma. Tome 3. Le cinéma devient un art – L'avant-guerre, Denoël, 1950–1975
- Histoire générale du cinéma. Tome 4. Le cinéma devient un art – La première guerre mondiale, Denoël, 1950–1975
- Histoire générale du cinéma. Tome 5. L'Art muet – L'après-guerre en Europe, Denoël, 1950–1975
- Histoire générale du cinéma. Tome 6. L'Art muet – Hollywood – La fin du muet, Denoël, 1950–1975
- Histoire générale du cinéma. Tome 6 (according to the initial outline). L'époque contemporaine (1939-1954) – 1/Le cinéma pendant la guerre (1939–1945), Denoël, 1946, rééd. 1954
- Histoire de l'art du cinéma, 3e édition, Flammarion, 1949
- Histoire du cinéma mondial, des origines à nos jours, Flammarion, 1949; éd. revue et augmentée, 1968
- le Cinéma français, Flammarion, 1962
- Dictionnaire des films, 1965
- Dictionnaire des cinéastes, 1965
