= Fernand Labori =

French lawyer and politician (1860–1917)

Fernand Gustave Gaston Labori
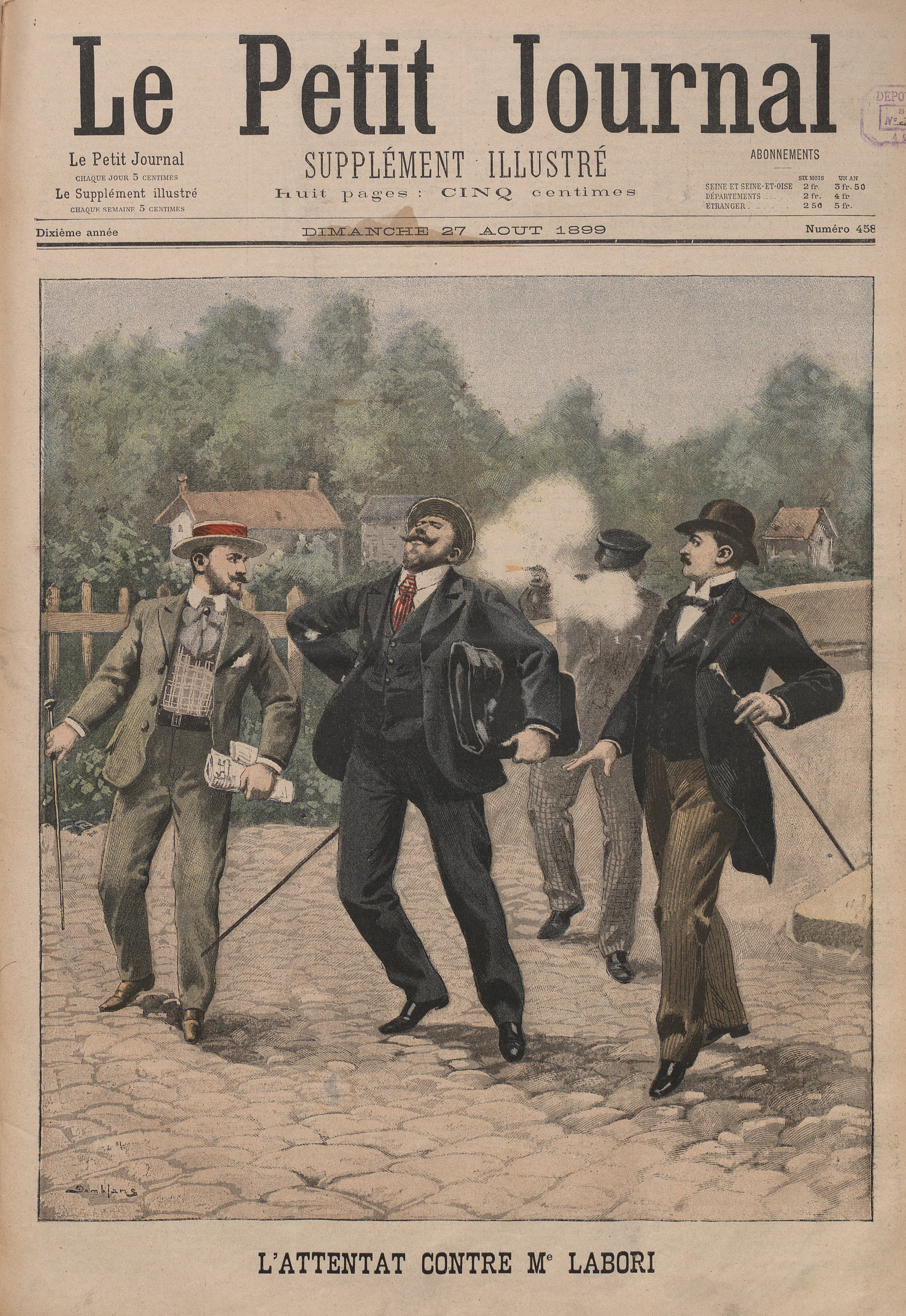
- The assassination attempt on Fernand Labori on the front page of Le Petit Journal
- Born: 18 April 1860; Reims, France
- Died: 14 March 1917 (aged 56); Montparnasse Cemetery, Paris
- Occupation: Lawyer
- Spouse: Marguerite de Pachmann
- Relatives: Prince Philip of Bourbon-Two Sicilies (son-in-law)

Fernand-Gustave-Gaston Labori (April 18, 1860 – March 14, 1917) was a French attorney. He was born in Reims and educated at the Faculty of Law of Paris. In his professional life he defended the accused in some of the most prominent political cases of his day. Among his noted clients was Alfred Dreyfus whose acquittal on the charge of treason he was unable to secure at his 1899 trial, but Dreyfus was eventually pardoned by the French President and rehabilitated at the end of the long Dreyfus affair (1894–1906).

== Legal career ==
Labori was elected second secrétaire de Conférence du barreau de Paris and he was the defence counsel for:

- Anarchist Auguste Vaillant, who threw a bomb into the French Chamber of Deputies, injuring 20 people, and who was sentenced to death
- Émile Zola in 1898 in the Dreyfus trial
- Captain Alfred Dreyfus at his court martial in Rennes in 1899
- Thérèse Humbert in the case of the Crawford inheritance who pretended to be an heir of American millionaire Robert Crawford; the case sometimes was described as 'the swindle of the century'
- Henriette Caillaux in 1914 who was the wife of former Prime Minister of France Joseph Caillaux

His speeches were regarded as masterpieces of forensic eloquence.

== Assassination attempt ==
During the Dreyfus trial, Labori was the victim of an assassination attempt which hospitalized him for a week. The assailant was never identified.

== Death ==
He is buried at the Montparnasse Cemetery.

== Bibliography ==
- Labori, ses notes manuscrites, sa vie. Editor V. Attinger. Author Marguerite Labori, 1947, Paris,
- Labori, pour Zola, pour Dreyfus, contre la terre entière, un avocat. Editor L. Audibert, Authors Thierry Lévy and Jean-Pierre Royer, Paris 2006, ISBN 2-84749-083-3
