= Warwick Trading Company =

- Industry: Film production
- Founded: 1898; 127 years ago in London, England
- Defunct: 1915

The Warwick Trading Company was a British film production and distribution company, which operated between 1898 and 1915.

== History ==
The Warwick Trading Company had its origins in the London office of Maguire and Baucus, a firm run by two American businessmen who, from 1894, acted as agents marketing films and projectors produced by Thomas Edison. In 1897, they also acquired the rights to distribute films produced by the Lumière brothers.

Later that year, Charles Urban was appointed managing director. Urban was dissatisfied with the current location of the offices, in Broad Street, and proposed a move to a building in Warwick Court, which was nearer to like-minded businesses such as that of Robert W. Paul. Urban also suggested a simultaneous name change, as he felt company's current name, the Continental Commerce Company, was difficult to do business with. The company was thus rebranded as the Warwick Trading Company, after the address of its new offices in Warwick Court. The new company was officially registered in May 1898. Urban oversaw significant growth in the company's operations, and it became a highly regarded film producer and distributor, with a particular focus on actuality films, travel and reportage. It distributed films from the Lumière brothers, George Albert Smith, James Williamson and Georges Méliès. The company also sold film equipment manufactured by Alfred Darling. At its peak, the Company either produced or distributed three-quarters of the films exhibited in Britain.

Urban left the company in 1903, amid disagreements with Maguire and Baucus, and also with Alfred Jackaman Ellis, who had become the co-managing director in 1900. He set up another firm, the Charles Urban Trading Company, taking a number of key staff members with him, including well-known saleswoman Alice Rosenthal and cameraman and assistant manager John Gilman Avery. Between 1906 and 1909 the Warwick Trading Company was headed by Will Barker, and between 1913 and 1915 by the naturalist photographer Cherry Kearton, after which the company went into receivership.
