= Deus ex machina =

Device to resolve the plot of a dramatic work

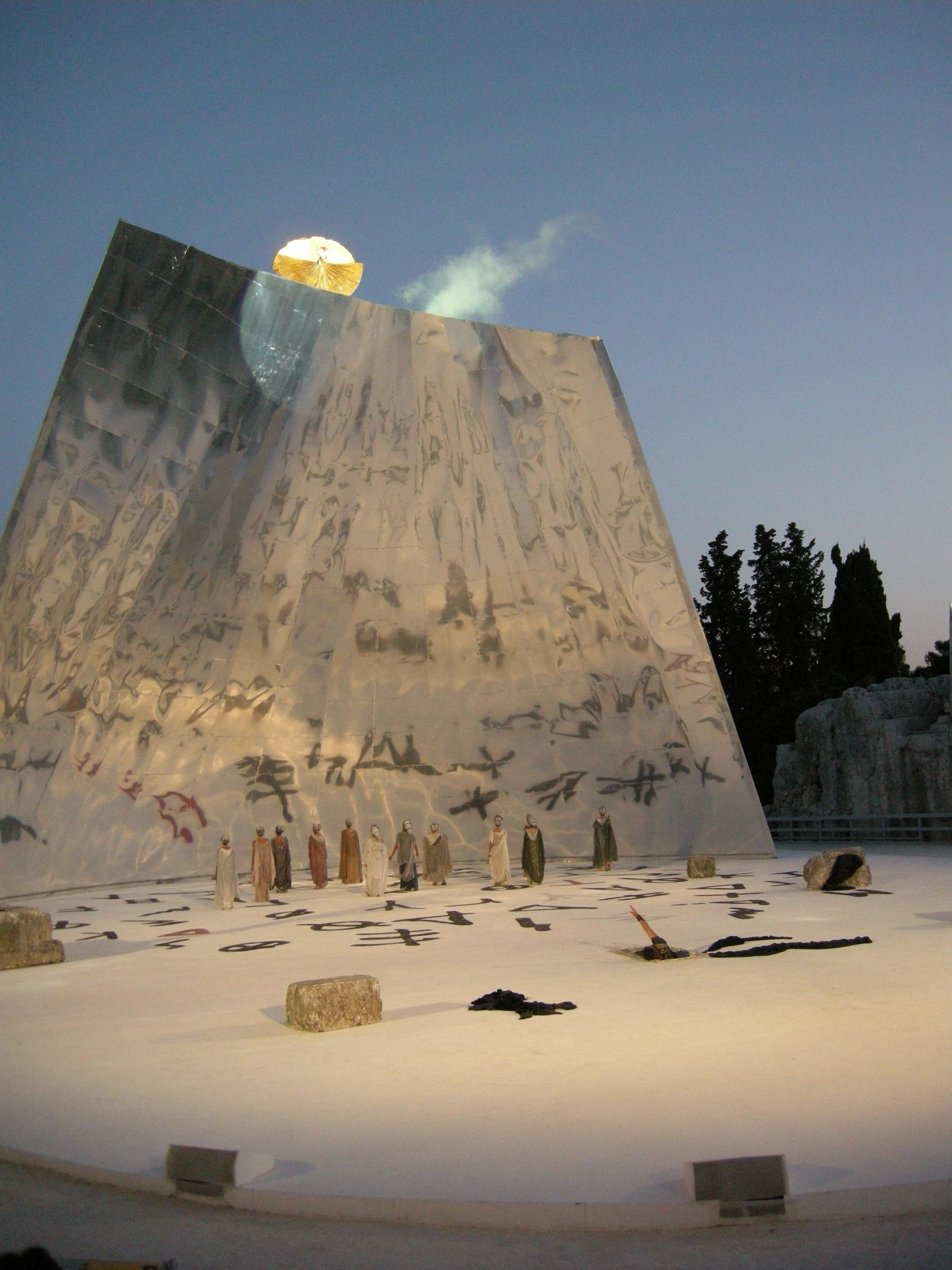
Deus ex machina in Euripides's Medea, performed in 2009 in Syracuse, Italy; the sun god sends a golden chariot to rescue Medea.

Deus ex machina (/ˈdeɪəs ɛks ˈmækɪnə, ˈmɑːk-/ DAY-əs ex-MA(H)K-in-ə; Latin: [ˈdɛ.ʊs ɛks ˈmaːkʰɪnaː]; plural: dei ex machina; 'God from the machine') is a plot device, a type of denouement in which a seemingly unsolvable problem in a story is suddenly resolved by an unexpected and unlikely occurrence. Its function is generally to resolve an otherwise irresolvable plot situation, to surprise the audience, to bring the tale to a happy ending, or act as a comedic device.

== Etymology ==
Deus ex machina is a Latin calque from Greek ἀπὸ μηχανῆς θεός (apò mēkhanês theós) 'god from the machine'. The term was coined from the conventions of ancient Greek theater, where actors who were playing gods were brought on stage using a machine. The machine could be either a crane (mechane) used to lower actors from above or a riser that brought them up through a trapdoor. Aeschylus introduced the idea and it was used often to resolve the conflict and conclude the drama. The device is associated mostly with Greek tragedy, although it also appeared in comedies.

=== Ancient examples ===
Aeschylus used the device in his Eumenides but it became an established stage machine with Euripides. More than half of Euripides's extant tragedies employ a deus ex machina in their resolution and some critics claim that Euripides invented it, not Aeschylus. A frequently cited example is Euripides's Medea in which the deus ex machina is a dragon-drawn chariot sent by the sun god Helios, used to convey his granddaughter Medea away from her husband Jason to the safety of Athens. In Alcestis, the heroine agrees to give up her own life to spare the life of her husband Admetus. At the end, Heracles appears and seizes Alcestis from Death, restoring her to life and to Admetus.

Aristophanes' play Thesmophoriazusae parodies Euripides's frequent use of the crane by making Euripides himself a character in the play and bringing him on stage by way of the mechane.

The device produced an immediate emotional response in Greek audiences. They would have a feeling of wonder and astonishment at the appearance of the gods, which would often add to the moral effect of the drama.

=== Modern theatrical examples ===
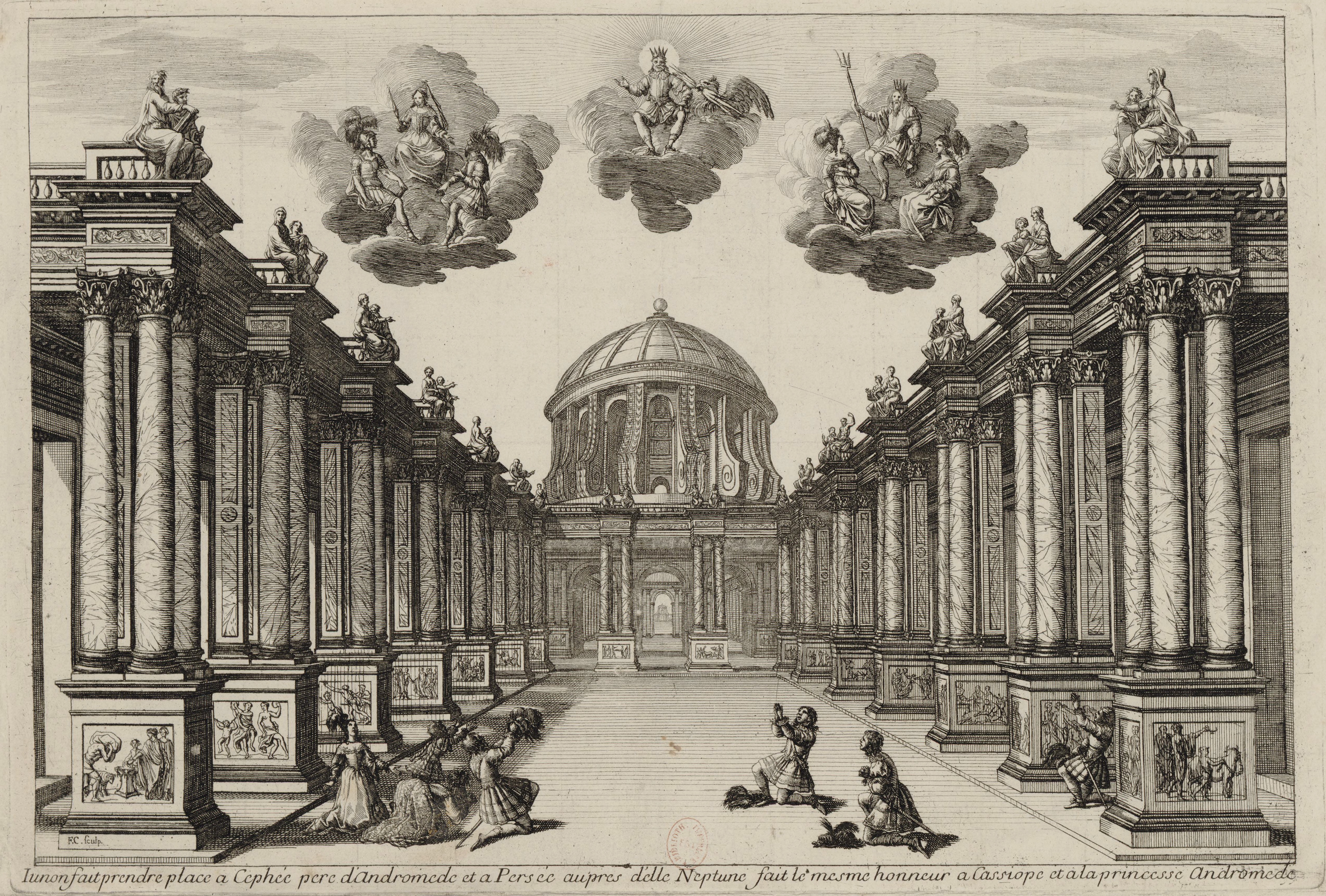
Characters ascend into heaven to become gods at the end of the 1650 play Andromède.

Shakespeare uses the device in As You Like It, Pericles, Prince of Tyre, and Cymbeline. John Gay uses it in The Beggar's Opera where a character breaks the action and rewrites the ending as a reprieve from hanging for MacHeath. During the politically turbulent 17th and 18th centuries, the deus ex machina was sometimes used to make a controversial thesis more palatable to the powers of the day. For example, in the final scene of Molière's Tartuffe, the heroes are saved from a terrible fate by an agent of the compassionate, all-seeing King Louis XIV – the same king who held Molière's career and livelihood in his hands.

== Plot device ==
Aristotle (in the Poetics 15 1454b1) was the first to use a Greek term equivalent to the Latin phrase deus ex machina to describe the technique as a device to resolve the plot of tragedies. It is generally considered to be undesirable in writing and often implies a lack of creativity on the part of the author. The reasons for this are that it damages the story's internal logic and is often so unlikely that it challenges the reader's suspension of disbelief.

=== Examples ===
- Avengers: Endgame writers Christopher Markus and Stephen McFeely said that the time travel plot device in the 2019 film was the result of having written themselves into a corner in the previous movie. Also, the sudden arrival of Captain Marvel in the climax of the film has been criticized as bordering on a deus ex machina because "her late arrival to the final battle ... feels like a function of her powers being too strong".
- The Great Eagles in J. R. R. Tolkien's The Lord of the Rings carrying Frodo and Samwise out of Mordor have been critiqued as a deus ex machina.
- Lord of the Flies: A passing navy officer rescues the stranded children. William Golding called that a "gimmick"; other critics view it as a deus ex machina. The abrupt ending conveys the terrible fate that would have afflicted the children if the officer had not arrived at that moment.
- The War of the Worlds: The Martians in H. G. Wells's novel have destroyed everything in their path and apparently triumphed over humanity, but they are suddenly killed by bacteria.
- The Germ Growers: An alien invasion novel that predates The War of the Worlds. In Robert Potter's novel, the shape-shifting alien invaders goal of wiping out all of humanity via lab grown diseases seems inevitable. A group of benevolent aliens suddenly appear and drives them off.
- Oliver Twist: Charles Dickens used the device when Rose Maylie turns out to be the long-lost sister of Agnes, and therefore Oliver's aunt; she marries her long-time sweetheart Harry, allowing Oliver to live happily with his savior Mr. Brownlow.

== In medicine ==
In medicine, the phrase is often used for supposedly "magical remedies" which are not likely to work in practice. For example, in the 2020 COVID-19 outbreak, when double lung transplantation for terminal COVID-19 patients was suggested, it was immediately denounced as a deus ex machina. In 2006, when electronic fetal heart monitoring was being touted as a preventive measure for cerebral palsy, The New England Journal of Medicine denounced it as deus ex machina.

== Criticism ==
The deus ex machina device is often criticized as inartistic, too convenient, and overly simplistic. However, champions of the device say that it opens up ideological and artistic possibilities.

=== Ancient criticism ===
Antiphanes was one of the device's earliest critics. He believed that the use of the deus ex machina was a sign that the playwright was unable to properly manage the complications of his plot.

when they don't know what to say
and have completely given up on the play
just like a finger they lift the machine
and the spectators are satisfied.

— Antiphanes

Another critical reference to the device can be found in Plato's dialogue Cratylus, 425d, though it is made in the context of an argument unrelated to drama.

Aristotle criticized the device in his Poetics, where he argued that the resolution of a plot must arise internally, following from previous action of the play:

In the characters, too, exactly as in the structure of the incidents, [the poet] ought always to seek what is either necessary or probable, so that it is either necessary or probable that a person of such-and-such a sort say or do things of the same sort, and it is either necessary or probable that this [incident] happen after that one. It is obvious that the solutions of plots, too, should come about as a result of the plot itself, and not from a contrivance, as in the Medea and in the passage about sailing home in the Iliad. A contrivance must be used for matters outside the drama — either previous events, which are beyond human knowledge, or later ones that need to be foretold or announced. For we grant that the gods can see everything. There should be nothing improbable in the incidents; otherwise, it should be outside the tragedy, e.g., that in Sophocles' Oedipus.

— Poetics, (1454a33–1454b9)

Aristotle praised Euripides, however, for generally ending his plays with bad fortune, which he viewed as correct in tragedy, and somewhat excused the intervention of a deity by suggesting that "astonishment" should be sought in tragic drama:

Irrationalities should be referred to what people say: That is one solution, and also sometimes that it is not irrational, since it is probable that improbable things will happen.

Such a device was referred to by Horace in his Ars Poetica (lines 191–2), where he instructs poets that they should never resort to a "god from the machine" to resolve their plots "unless a difficulty worthy of a god's unraveling should happen" [nec deus intersit, nisi dignus uindice nodus inciderit; nec quarta loqui persona laboret].

=== Modern criticism ===
Following Aristotle, Renaissance critics continued to view the deus ex machina as an inept plot device, although it continued to be employed by Renaissance dramatists.

Toward the end of the 19th century, Friedrich Nietzsche criticized Euripides for making tragedy an optimistic genre by use of the device, and was highly skeptical of the "Greek cheerfulness", prompting what he viewed as the plays' "blissful delight in life". The deus ex machina as Nietzsche saw it was symptomatic of Socratic culture, which valued knowledge over Dionysiac music and ultimately caused the death of tragedy:

But the new non-Dionysiac spirit is most clearly apparent in the endings of the new dramas. At the end of the old tragedies there was a sense of metaphysical conciliation without which it is impossible to imagine our taking delight in tragedy; perhaps the conciliatory tones from another world echo most purely in Oedipus at Colonus. Now, once tragedy had lost the genius of music, tragedy in the strictest sense was dead: for where was that metaphysical consolation now to be found? Hence an earthly resolution for tragic dissonance was sought; the hero, having been adequately tormented by fate, won his well-earned reward in a stately marriage and tokens of divine honour. The hero had become a gladiator, granted freedom once he had been satisfactorily flayed and scarred. Metaphysical consolation had been ousted by the deus ex machina.

— Friedrich Nietzsche

Nietzsche argued that the deus ex machina creates a false sense of consolation that ought not to be sought in phenomena. His denigration of the plot device has prevailed in critical opinion.

In Euripides the Rationalist (1895), Arthur Woollgar Verrall surveyed and recorded other late 19th-century responses to the device. He recorded that some of the critical responses to the term referred to it as 'burlesque', 'coup de théâtre', and 'catastrophe'. Verrall notes that critics have a dismissive response to authors who deploy the device in their writings. He comes to the conclusion that critics feel that the deus ex machina is evidence of the author's attempt to ruin the whole of his work and to prevent anyone from putting any importance on his work.

However, other scholars have looked at Euripides's use of deus ex machina and described its use as an integral part of the plot, designed for a specific purpose. Often, Euripides's plays would begin with gods, so it is argued that it would be natural for the gods to finish the action. The conflict throughout Euripides's plays would be caused by the meddling of the gods, so it would make sense both to the playwright and to the audience of the time that the gods would resolve all conflict that they began. Half of Euripides's eighteen extant plays end with the use of deus ex machina; therefore, it was not simply a device to relieve the playwright of the embarrassment of a confusing plot-ending. This device enabled him to bring about a natural and more dignified dramatic and tragic ending.

Other champions of the device believe that it can be a spectacular agent of subversion. It can be used to undercut generic conventions and challenge cultural assumptions and the privileged role of tragedy as a literary/theatrical model.

Some 20th-century revisionist criticism suggests that deus ex machina cannot be viewed in these simplified terms, and contends that the device allows mortals to "probe" their relationship with the divine. Rush Rehm in particular cites examples of Greek tragedy in which the deus ex machina complicates the lives and attitudes of characters confronted by the deity, while simultaneously bringing the drama home to its audience. Sometimes, the unlikeliness of the deus ex machina plot device is employed deliberately. An example is shown through the comic effect generated in Monty Python's Life of Brian, when Brian, who lives in Judea at the time of Christ, is saved from a high fall by a passing alien spaceship.

== See also ==
- Chekhov's gun
- Eucatastrophe
- MacGuffin
- Peripeteia
- Plot armor
