= Féerie =

Theatre genre

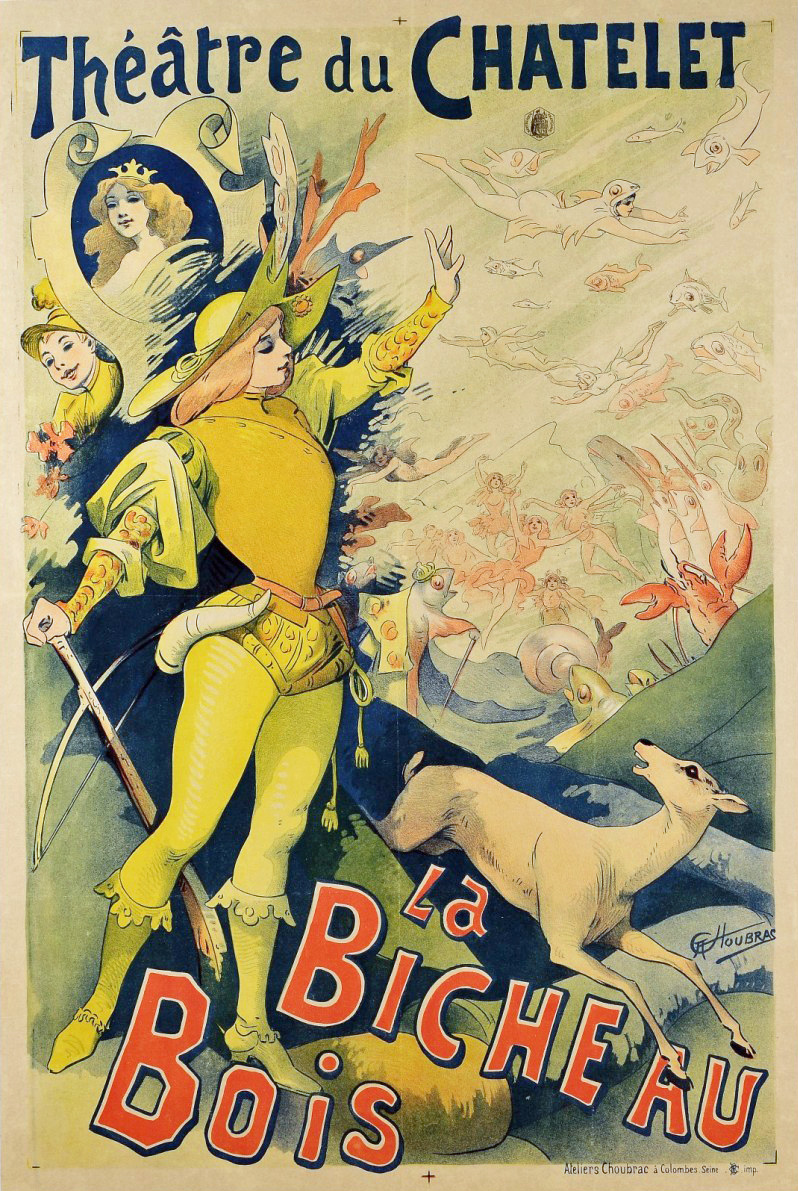
Poster by Alfred Choubrac for an 1890 Théâtre du Châtelet production of La Biche au bois

Féerie (French pronunciation: [feʁi]), sometimes translated as "fairy play", was a French theatrical genre known for fantasy plots and spectacular visuals, including lavish scenery and mechanically worked stage effects. Féeries blended music, dancing, pantomime, and acrobatics, as well as magical transformations created by designers and stage technicians, to tell stories with clearly defined melodrama-like morality and an extensive use of supernatural elements. The genre developed in the early 19th century and became immensely popular in France throughout the nineteenth century, influencing the development of burlesque, musical comedy and film.

== Style ==
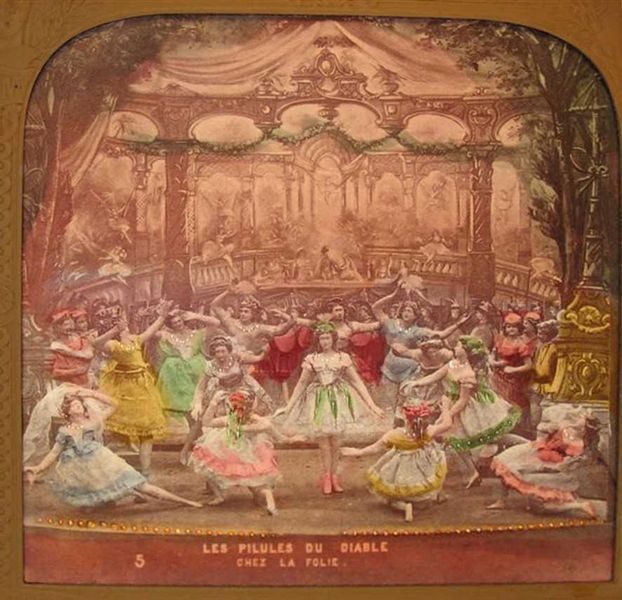
Stereo card of a scene from Les Pilules du diable

Féeries used a fairy-tale aesthetic to combine theatre with music, dances, mime, acrobatics, and especially spectacular visual effects created by innovative stage machinery, such as trap doors, smoke machines, and quickly changeable sets. Songs always appeared, usually featuring new lyrics to familiar melodies. Transformation scenes, in which a scene would change as if by magic in full view of the audience, were an important component of the style; until 1830, nearly all scene changes in féeries were full-view transformations. The last transformation in a féerie, accompanied by a flourish of music, led to the apotheosis: a grand final stage picture, usually involving beautiful supernumeraries descending from the sky or suspended on wires.

These elements, especially the spectacle and stage effects, were far more prominent than the plot. The critic Francisque Sarcey suggested that for a féerie, the crew in charge of design and stagecraft should be regarded as more important than the writers, noting that the scripts themselves were so incoherent that "one can put the beginning at the end, and vice versa." Théophile Gautier even suggested, with considerable irony, that the immensely successful féerie Les Pilules du diable could be performed as a purely mimed production, so that no spoken words would distract the audience from the spectacle they had come to enjoy. (Note: In a review of L'Etoile du berger, an 1846 féerie at the Théâtre de l'Ambigu-Comique, Gauthier joked that the playbill should have included the line "the play has been done away with, as it detracted from the scenery".) The total effect was one of a dazzling, dreamlike array of visuals, harkening back to fairy-tale traditions and a childlike sense of wonder through the use of innovative stage technology. In a review of The Blue Bird, a writer in the Journal des débats commented satirically on the spectacular frivolity of a typical féerie, but positively on the genre's vast potential for creativity:

Nothing is more rare than a féerie which is not an absurd mixture of ridiculous adventures and burlesque inventions and which consists otherwise only as an exhibition of tricks, costumes and decors … Nevertheless what resources are offered by the féerie to the poetic imagination!

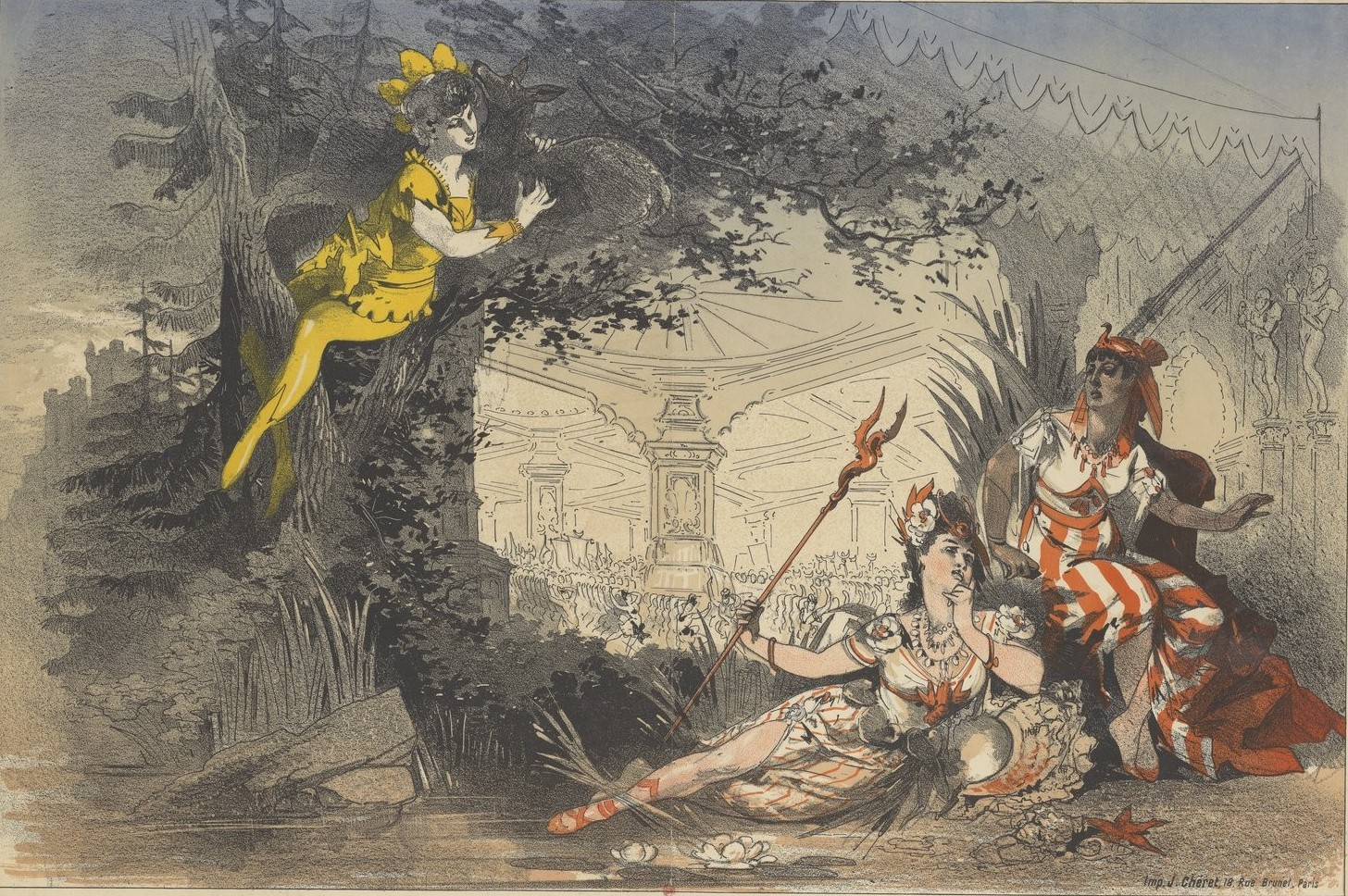
Poster for an 1876 production of La Biche au bois

The plots of féeries were usually borrowed from fairy tales in the French tradition, such as those by Charles Perrault and Madame d'Aulnoy; other féeries borrowed from outside sources such as the One Thousand and One Nights, or created original plots. Like melodramas, the form féeries involved a stirring battle between forces of good and evil. However, where melodrama merely suggested the existence of these extremes, féeries made them unabashedly literal by embodying them as witches, gnomes, and other supernatural creatures. The clear moral tone was heightened by the dialogue, which often included maxims about love, duty, virtue, and similar topics. A full-length féerie often ran for several hours.

Four human characters reliably appeared among the supernatural forces: two young lovers (an ingenue and her heroic suitor), an often comical and grotesque rival for the affections of the ingenue, and a lazy valet obsessed with eating. The supernatural forces in the plot drove these characters through fantastic landscapes and multiple adventures, typically involving magic talismans used to transform people, things, and places. The apotheosis reunited the lovers to dazzling effect.

== Origins ==
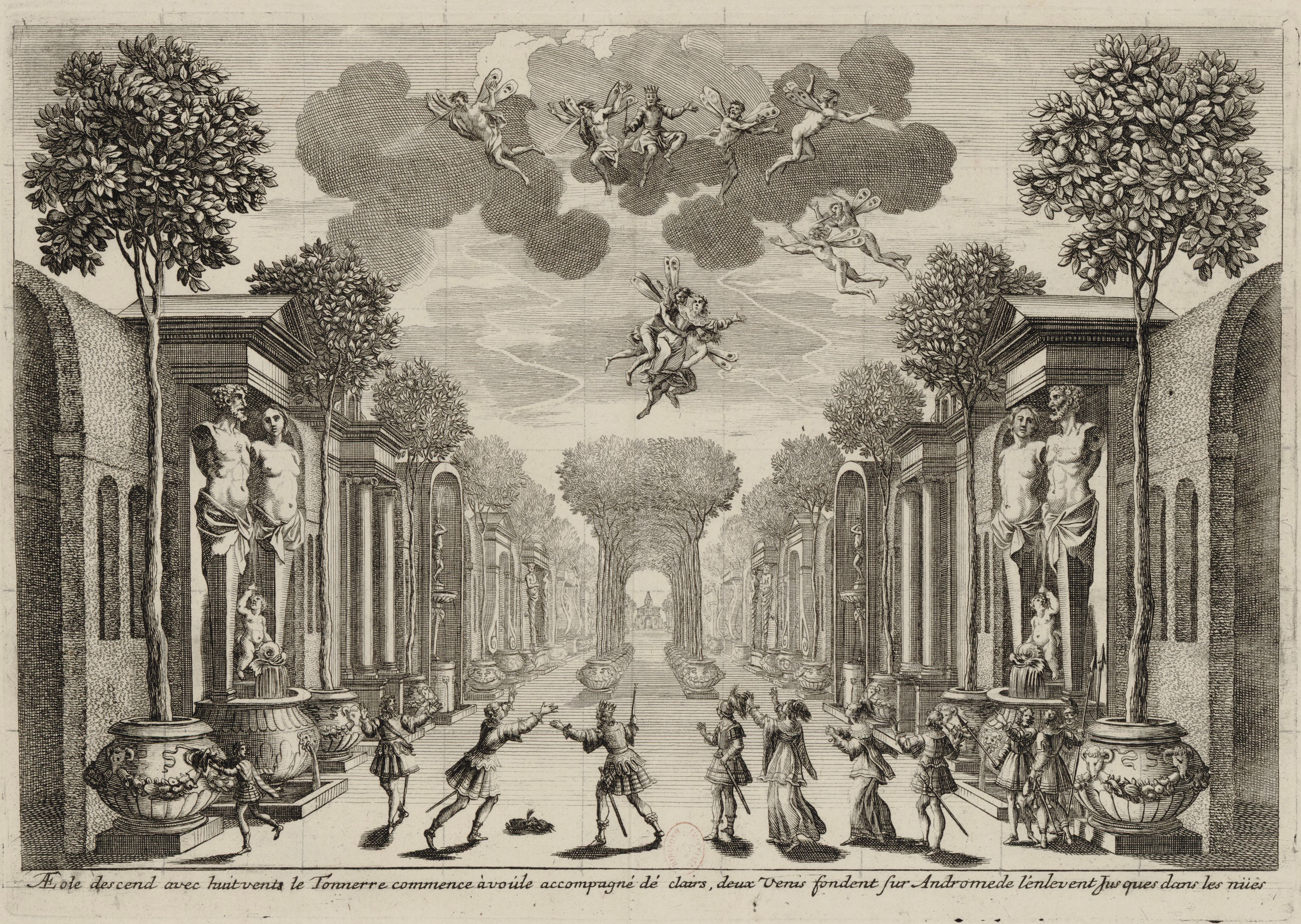
A scene from the original production of Corneille's Andromède, a precursor of the féerie

The féerie can trace its origins to the ballet de cour ("court ballet") tradition of the Renaissance, in which such court leaders as Catherine de' Medici and Henry IV of France would commission spectacularly designed ballets based on mythological subjects and fables. Another notable precursor is the pièces à machines ("plays with machines") genre, popular at the Théâtre du Marais in the mid 17th-century, again using mythology as source material; Molière's Psyché is a notable small-scale example, and Corneille's Andromède and La Toison d'or also count within the genre. These genres owed much to the theatrical engineering work of Italian architects, especially Nicola Sabbatini. These spectacles paved the way for 18th-century fairground pantomimes (théâtre de la foire), such as Arlequin dans un oeuf at the Théâtre des Jeunes-Artistes, or Les Eaux de Merlin by Alain-René Lesage. The fairground pantomimes, by combining motifs from the Commedia dell'Arte with lavish fantasy created by theatrical spectacle, served as the most direct precursor of the 19th-century féerie.

The French Revolution changed the face of French theatre, with a large new audience to please: the bourgeoisie. Various genres developed to please bourgeois tastes. The féerie, combining the fairground influences with the farcical style of comédie en vaudeville, began as a form of melodrama, but the gap between them quickly became highly pronounced. For the nineteenth century audience, the two genres stood at opposite ends of a spectrum: at one end was melodrama, with its plots calculated to make audiences weep; féerie filled a place at the other extreme, providing entertainment designed to make audiences laugh. Notable early attempts toward the genre were Cuvelier de Trie's adaptations of Tom Thumb and Puss-in-Boots, in 1801 and 1802, respectively. The development of the féerie was helped along by a growing French interest in the literary qualities of classic fairy tales, and by the popularity of the One Thousand and One Nights after its first publication in France.

== Early successes ==
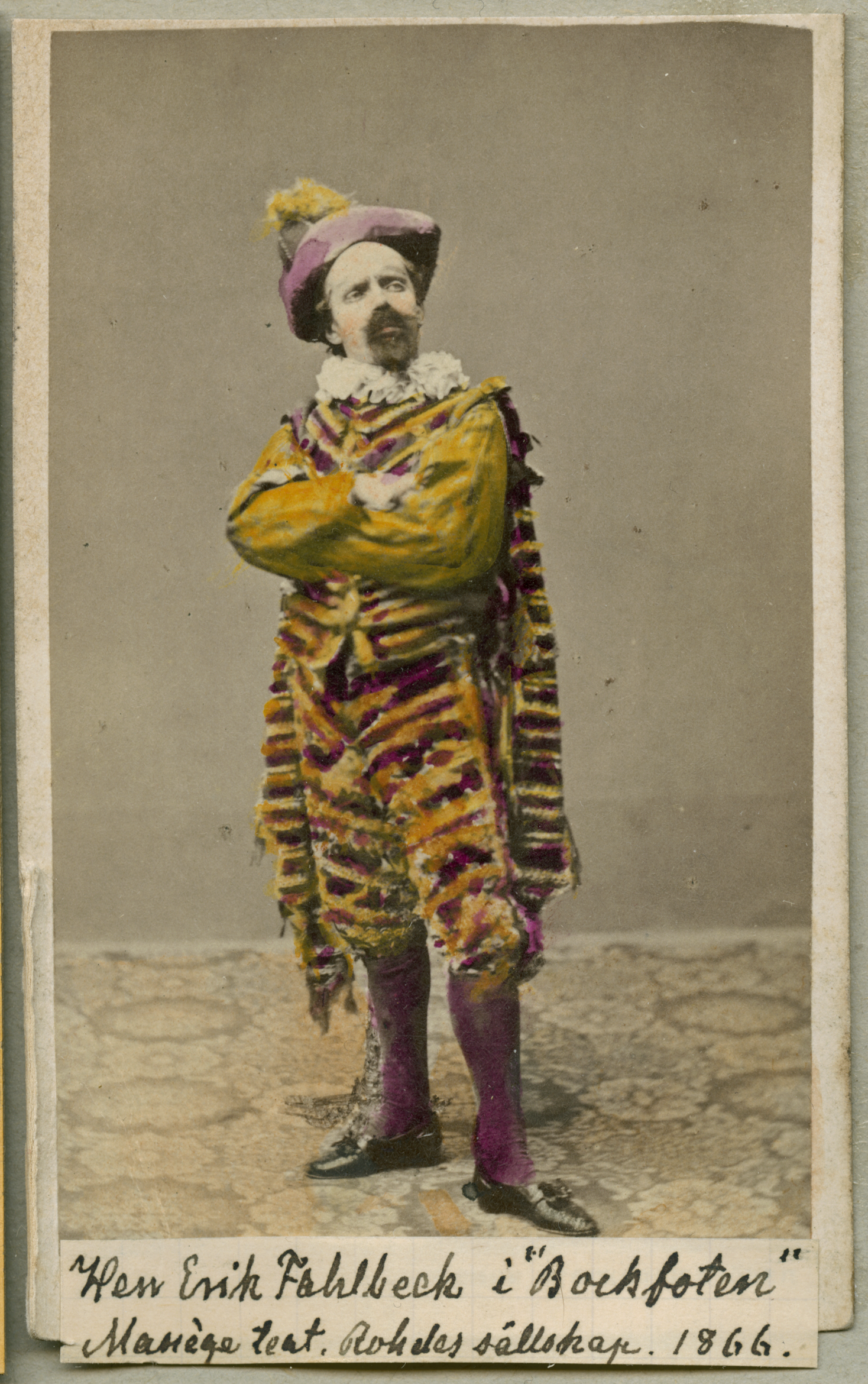
Erik Fahlbeck in an 1866 Swedish production of Le Pied de mouton

The féerie in the full 19th-century sense of the word was born on 6 December 1806, with the premiere at the Théâtre de la Gaîté of Le Pied de mouton ("The Mutton Foot"). The play, written by Alphonse Martainville in collaboration with the actor César Ribié, follows the quest of a lovesick hero, Guzman, to save his lover Leonora from the hands of a villainous rival. With the help of a magic talisman (the mutton foot of the title) and under the watch of a fairy who espouses the value of virtue and duty, Guzman braves his way through a series of spectacular trials, spiced with music, ballet, and duels. Thanks to stage machinery, magical events flow freely through the play: portraits move, people fly, chaperones transform into guitarists, food disappears. In the end, love conquers all, and the fairy intervenes once more to ensure the triumph of good over evil.

Le Pied de mouton was widely successful and frequently revived. It codified the standard form of féeries for the next hundred years: a narrative in which the hero or heroes undergo a series of adventures through spectacular scenes, with the sets often "magically" transforming in view of the audience. Scholars continue to cite it as a quintessential example of the genre.

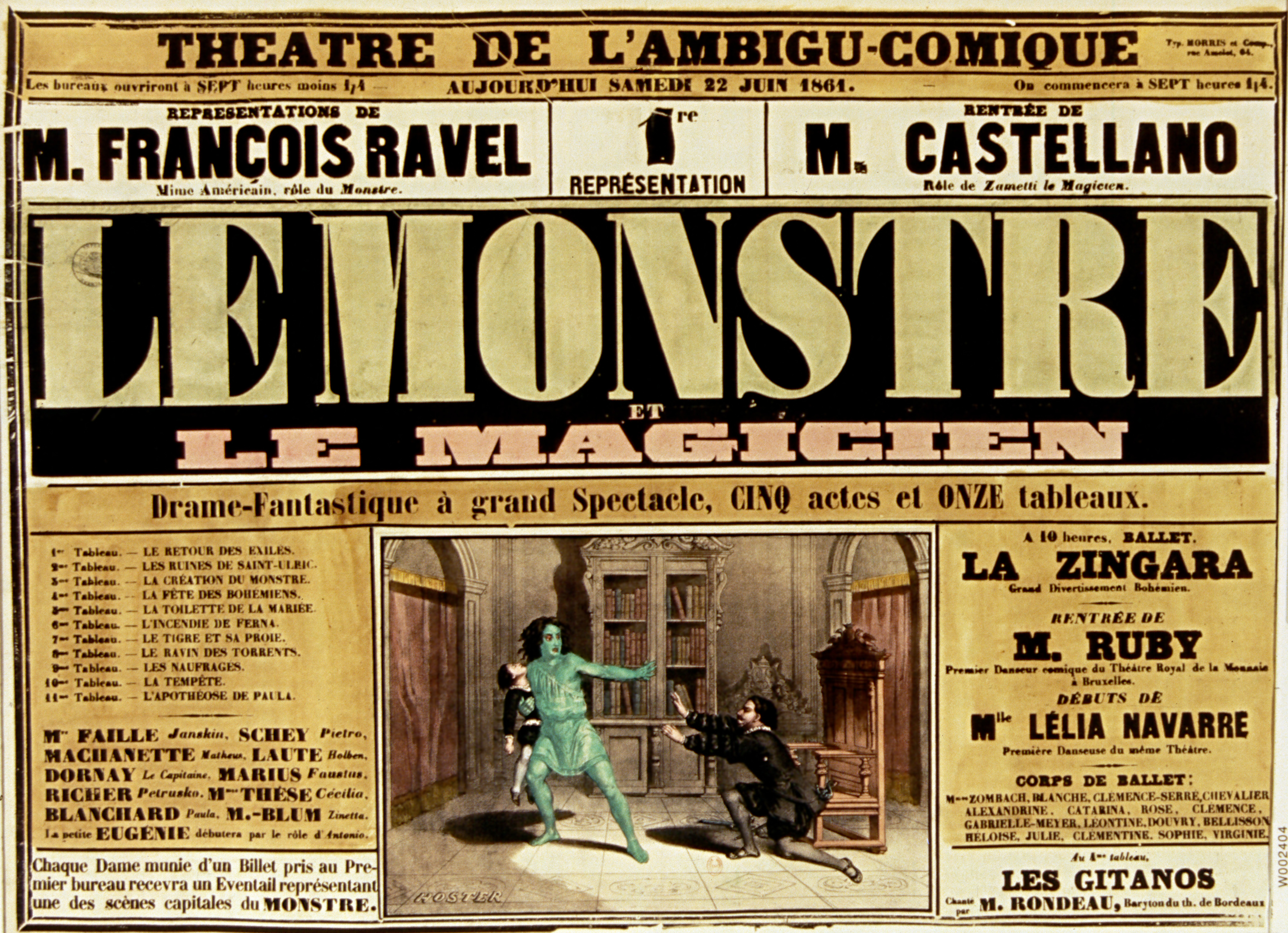
Poster for an 1861 production of Le Monstre et le magicien

The féerie, once established, quickly flourished; between 1800 and 1820 alone, some sixty féeries were produced. An 1826 "mélodrame féerie" at the Porte Saint-Martin, Le Monstre et le magicien, struck new ground not only thematically—it had a Gothic edge and was based on Mary Shelley's Frankenstein—but also literally: an English designer, Tomkins, was brought in to install a complex new system of trapdoors in the stage floor. While the trap doors became a staple for féerie effects, the fashion for Gothic fiction onstage subsided by the 1830s. One of Guilbert de Pixérécourt's most famous works in the genre, Ondine or La Nymphe des Eaux (1830), marks the beginning of a popular trend for plots featuring romances between mortals and supernatural beings; it tells the balletic, often aquatic love story of the water nymph Ondine, who obtains a soul by falling in love with a mortal. Technical advances in stage machinery were quickly woven into new féerie productions: gas lighting, installed in most major Paris theaters by the late 1830s, allowed for more realistic set designs and various atmospheric effects, with limelight becoming especially useful to simulate sunbeams and moonbeams. Similarly, Louis Daguerre's invention of the diorama—a staged tableau animated and transformed by changes in lighting—widely influenced féerie transformation effects.

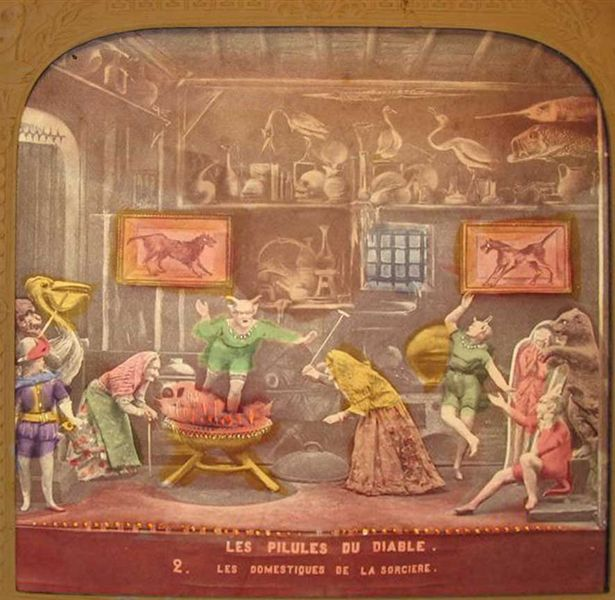
Stereo card of a scene from Les Pilules du diable

The first great hit to match the success of Le Pied de mouton was the Cirque Olympique's Les Pilules du diable (1839), from a script by the vaudeville writer Auguste Anicet-Bourgeois and two writers for circus productions, Laloue and Laurent. While the stage effects had gotten more spectacular since the initial féeries, the plots remained familiar; in this play, the rich hidalgo Sottinez, madly in love with the ingenue Isabelle, pursues her and her lover Albert through bizarre and spectacular adventures. Les Pilules du diable was widely revived and imitated, and was possibly the most celebrated féerie of all.

Later successful féeries included La Biche au bois, La Chatte Blanche, and Peau d'Âne, all of which borrowed heavily from fairy tales and romances while reframing their stories to suit the tastes of the day. The popular playwright Adolphe d'Ennery had a hit at the Gaîté in 1844 with Les Sept Châteaux du diable, a morality play-like fantasy in which a pair of young couples face temptations in castles representing the Seven Deadly Sins; among d'Ennery's other féeries is the similarly moral Rothomago (1862). Many successful féeries were the work of the prolific Cogniard brothers; their 1843 adaptation of the One Thousand and One Nights, Les Mille et une nuits, introduced exoticism to the genre while preserving its lighthearted vaudevillian dialogue. Other notable Cogniard productions were La Chatte blanche with the café-concert performer Thérésa, the trick-filled La Poudre de Perlinpinpin, and, in collaboration with the vaudeville writer Clairville, the 1858 Variétés production Les Bibelots du diable, a comic spectacle with winking references and allusions to most of the major féeries that had gone before it. The comic strain of Le Pied de mouton and Les Pilules du diable was emphasized in many of these successes, such as Les Sept Châteaux, Perlinpinpin, and Les Bibelots.

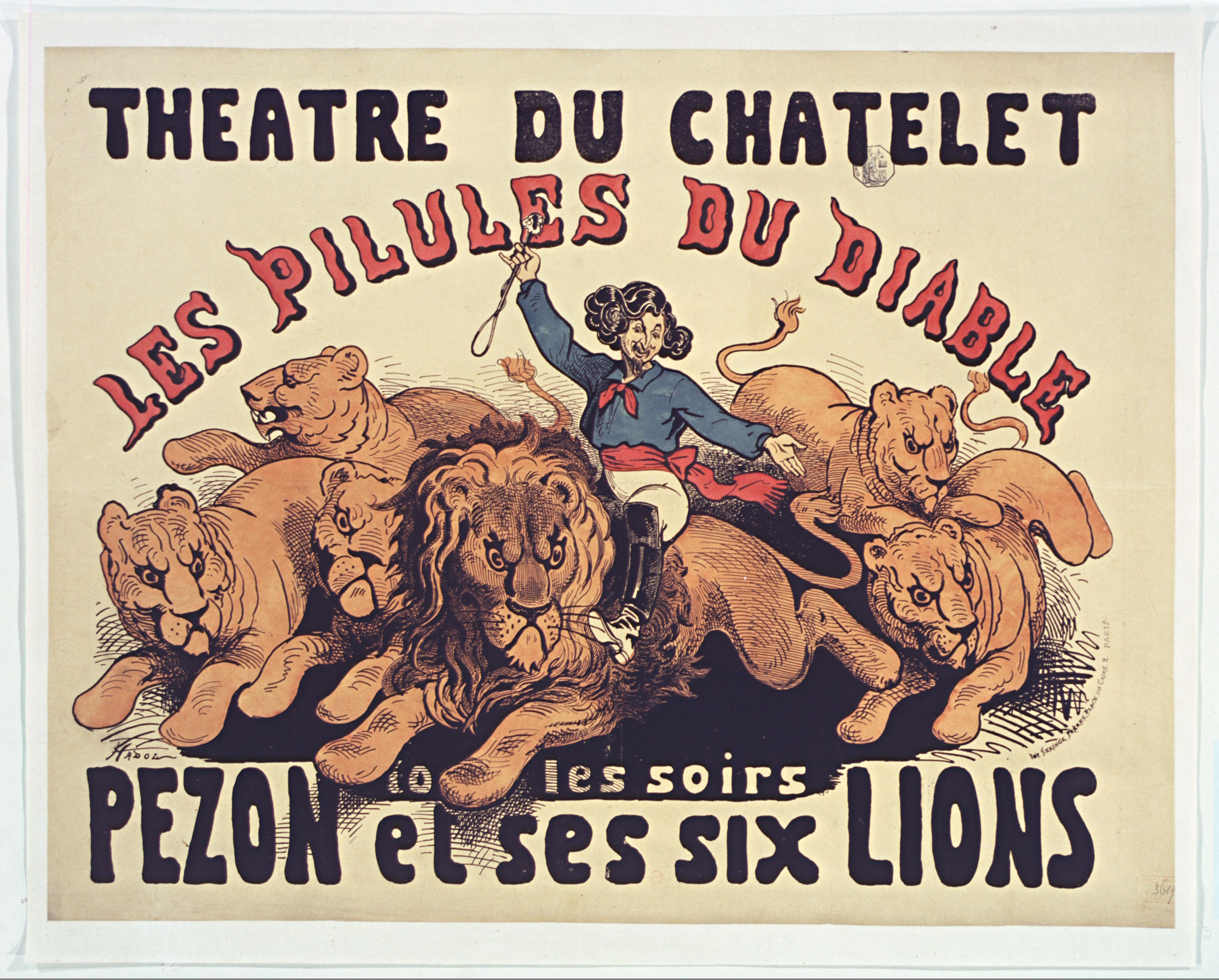
Poster for an 1874 Théâtre du Châtelet production of Les Pilules du diable

Because of the large scale of the spectacle, the biggest and most technically equipped Parisian stages became the most in-demand venues for the shows. The Cirque Olympique, formerly an arena used for political and equestrian spectacles, took advantage of its deep stage to present expensively mounted féeries; it was eventually replaced by a new auditorium built specifically for spectacle, the Théâtre du Châtelet. The Théâtre de la Porte Saint-Martin, originally designed for opera productions, had a stage and machinery well suited to the demands of the féerie, and flourished with the genre under the direction of Marc Fournier.

=== Evolution of the term ===
The term féerie began as an adjective, used together with more established descriptive terms to advertise a production's genre. Many of the first féeries were advertised as mélodrame-féeries ("fairy melodrama"; half of all féeries presented between 1800 and 1810 were so described), a description which fell out of favor during the 1810s. Pantomime-féeries, developed by the mime Deburau, became highly popular in the 1840s. Other popular descriptors included folie-féeries and comédie-féeries. Opéra-féeries, with an increased emphasis on music, first flourished in the 1820s, eventually developing into a form of operetta in such works as Jacques Offenbach's 1874 Le Voyage dans la lune. Most popular of all were vaudeville-féeries, written by vaudeville playwrights and featuring more songs and jokes than other productions did. This style became so widespread that by the late 1840s, vaudeville-féeries were known simply as féeries, and their particular tone became the standard across the genre.

== International variants ==
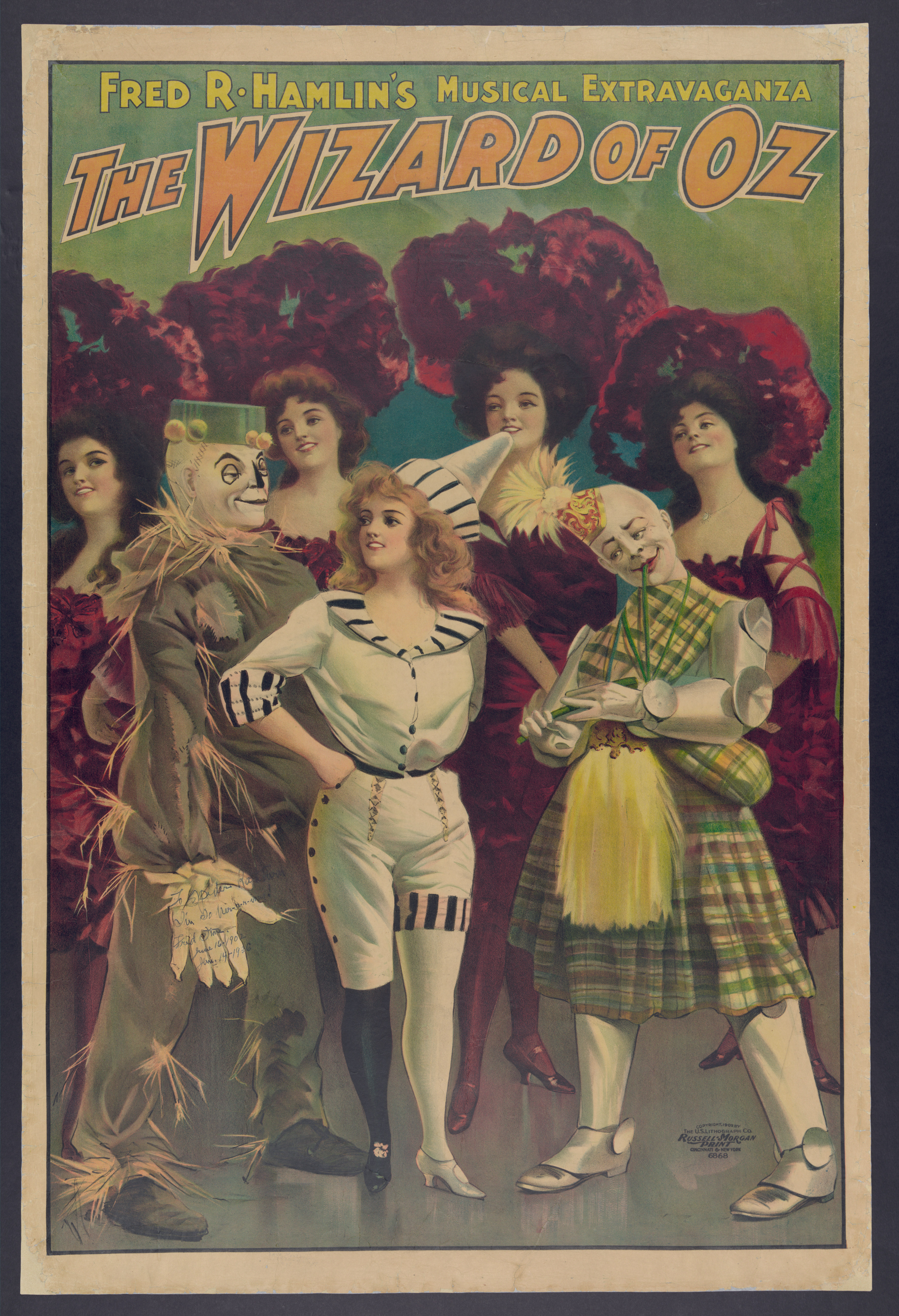
Poster for the 1903 fairy-tale extravaganza version of The Wizard of Oz

James Robinson Planché, after seeing a féerie at the Théâtre de la Porte Saint-Martin on his honeymoon in 1821, brought the genre to England as the "fairy extravaganza." He staged some twenty fairy extravaganzas in London between 1836 and 1854. The nineteenth-century pantomime also had strong similarities to the féerie, with one critic for a New Zealand newspaper describing Les 400 coups du diable as a "fairy play which in everything but in name is very much like our own Christmas pantomime". With its fairy-tale themes, the féerie can be also compared to later English "fairy plays" such as J. M. Barrie's Peter Pan or to American fairy-tale extravaganzas such as L. Frank Baum's musical version of The Wizard of Oz.

In Spain, the comedia de magia, a genre very similar to the féerie, began a rise to prominence in 1715 with the works of Juan Salvo y Vela. The form was well-established there by the time Juan Grimaldi adapted Le Pied de mouton for the Spanish stage in 1829. Grimaldi's version, La Pata de Cabra, was a pronounced popular success and was widely imitated.

In Russia, the concept of fairy-tale spectacle merged with narrative ballet to create the ballet-féerie ("fairy ballet"). This form took its name from the French genre and its dance characteristics from the Italian ballo grande style. It was often considered a lower-class, more commercialized entertainment than traditional ballet; many late-nineteenth-century Russian critics attacked it, describing it as a foreign threat to national ballet traditions. Nonetheless, the ballet-féerie form attracted considerable artistic attention: Pyotr Ilyich Tchaikovsky's The Sleeping Beauty and The Nutcracker are both ballet-féeries. Like the French féerie, the ballet-féerie emphasized spectacle and stage effects. Where previous dance stagings had emphasized the technique and solo virtuosity of the prima ballerina, the new genre put the focus on ensemble dances, magical transformations, and shifting stage pictures created with movement and color.

== Popularity ==
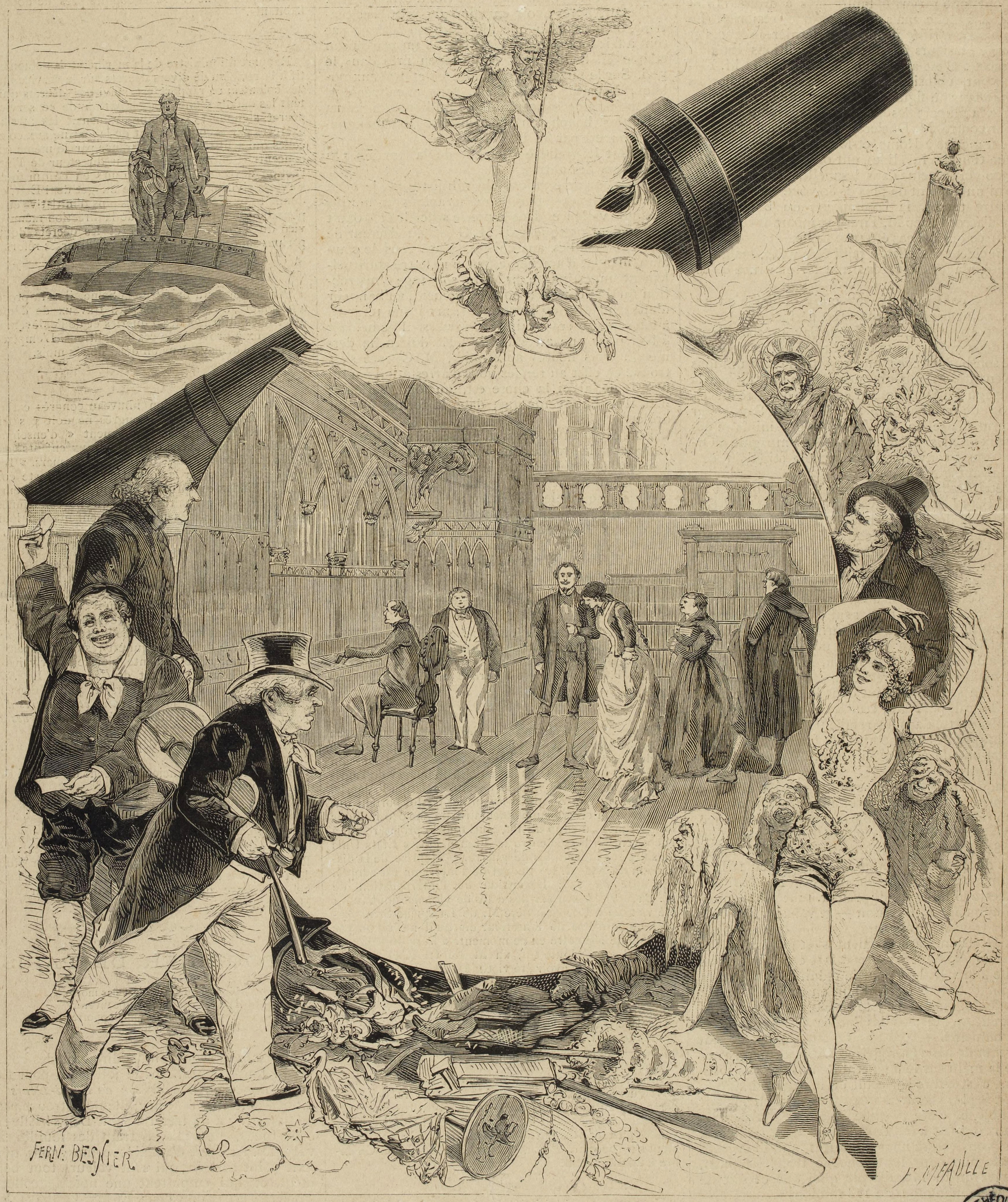
Scenes and characters from Jules Verne's féerie, Journey Through the Impossible

By the mid-nineteenth century, féeries had become one of the foremost venues for fairy-tale storytelling in popular culture, and had gained the fascination and respect of some of the foremost writers of the day. Théophile Gautier often reviewed them in his capacity as a writer on the theatre, comparing the shifting scenes and magical occurrences of the féerie to a dream:

What a charming summer spectacle is a féerie! That which doesn't demand any attention and unravels without logic, like a dream that we make wide awake … [It is] a symphony of forms, of colours and of lights … The characters, brilliantly clothed, wander through a perpetually changing series of tableaux, panic-stricken, stunned, running after each other, searching to reclaim the action which goes who knows where; but what does it matter! The dazzling of the eyes is enough to make for an agreeable evening.

The popularity of the féerie had its first peak in the 1850s; by the end of the decade, around the time of Les Bibelots du diable, the focus had shifted from the fairy-tale plot to extravaganza on its own terms. Siraudin and Delacour's 1856 satire La Queue de la poêle parodied the conventions of the genre, much as Frédérick Lemaître had done to melodrama in his version of L'Auberge des Adrets.

Though seen as somewhat old-fashioned during the 1860s, the genre saw a second surge in popularity from 1871 through the 1890s, in which ever more lavish versions of the genre's classics were mounted. In his 1885 dictionary of theatre arts, Arthur Pougin noted that "audiences always show up in great numbers to any [féerie] on offer, because they adore this truly magical entertainment", and praised the féerie as "surely a delightful entertainment when it is in the hands of a true poet. It freely enters the whimsy of his imagination and can both delight the viewer's mind and enchant their eyes."

One of the poems in Charles Baudelaire's Les Fleurs du mal, "L'Irreparable," was inspired by a féerie he had seen, La Belle aux Cheveaux d'Or, starring Marie Daubrun, an actress with whom he was smitten. Gustave Flaubert even wrote a full-length féerie, Le Château des cœurs, in 1863, though it was never performed. Jules Verne made his own contribution to the genre in 1881 with Journey Through the Impossible, written in collaboration with Adolphe d'Ennery and featuring themes and characters from Verne's well-known novels. Maurice Maeterlinck's 1908 play The Blue Bird was likewise described by contemporary observers as a féerie, though critics noted that it was a more overtly poetic and intellectual example of the genre than the classic Châtelet productions.

== Later years ==
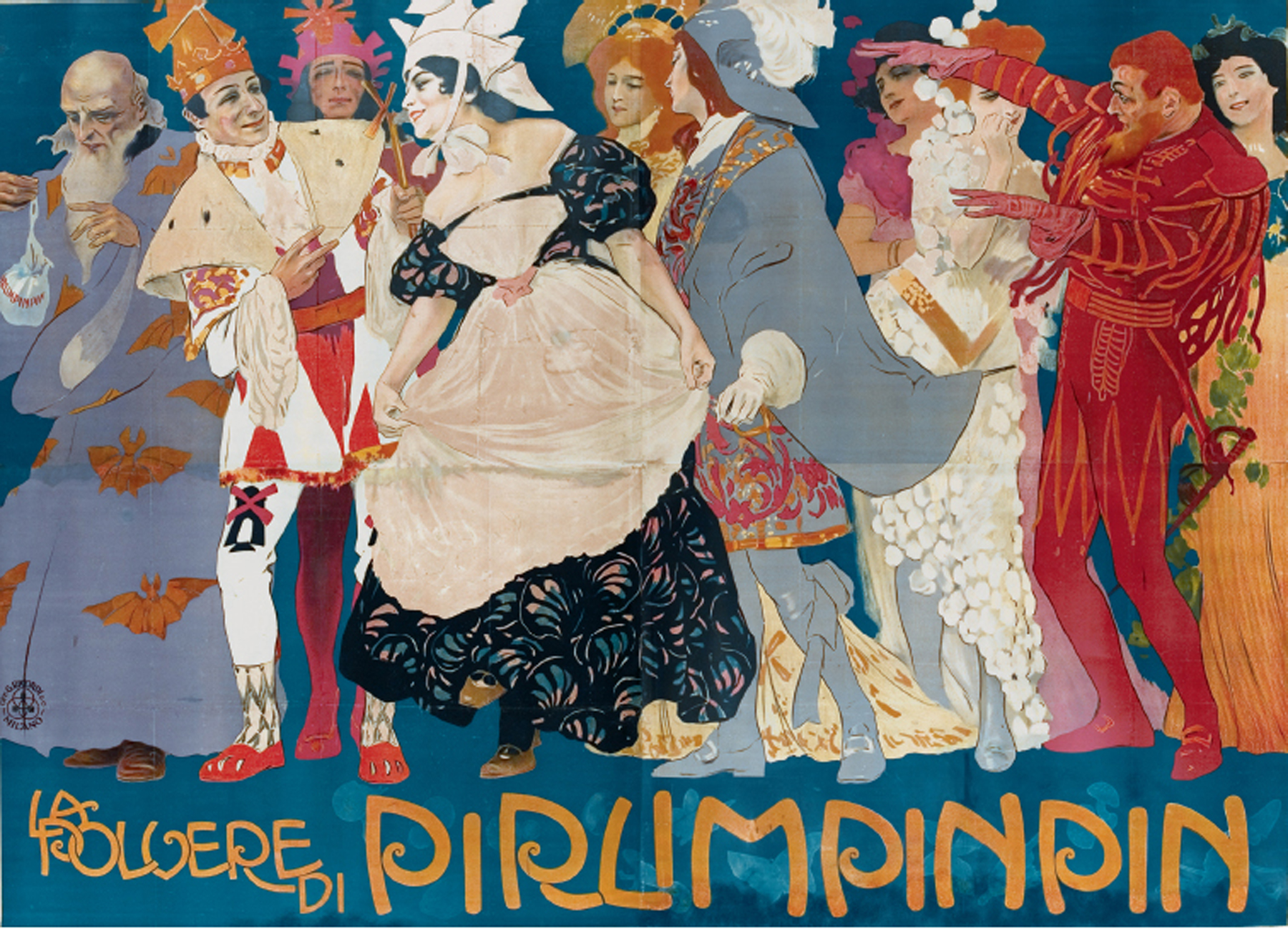
Poster for a 1907 Italian version of ''La Poudre de Perlinpinpin

From 1875's La Voyage dans la lune onward, some féeries began to show a trend for incorporating scientific and technological themes into their plots, a novelty due in part to the popularity and influence of Jules Verne's works. A related and very popular genre was also derived from Verne: the pièce de grand spectacle, an extravagantly lavish production built on a colorful but not fantasy-based plot. The genre was launched with Verne and d'Ennery's smash-hit 1874 dramatization of Around the World in Eighty Days, quickly followed by two further adaptations from the same team, The Children of Captain Grant and Michael Strogoff. The style of the pièce de grand spectacle was so close to the féerie that some critics found the terms interchangeable; Alphonse Daudet called Around the World "the most sumptuous, the most original of all féeries", while Jules Claretie said he overheard a theatregoer describe the show as La Biche au bois "by locomotive". Eventually, Around the World and Michael Strogoff, both immensely successful, codified the pièce de grand spectacle as a genre of its own, in competition with the similar but magic-based form of the "classical" féerie.

The féerie fell out of popularity by the end of the 19th century, by which time it was largely seen as entertainment for children. It disappeared from French stages just as another medium, the cinema, was beginning to supplant it as a form of storytelling spectacle.

== Legacy ==
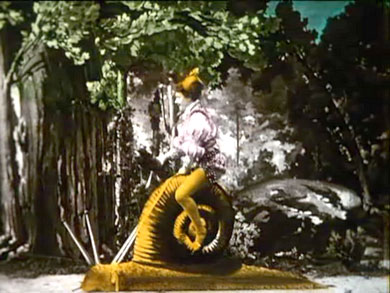
Scene from Albert Capellani's 1907 film version of Le Pied de mouton

With his 1899 film version of Cinderella, Georges Méliès brought the féerie into the newly developing world of motion pictures. The féerie quickly became one of film's most popular and lavishly mounted genres in the early years of the twentieth century, with such pioneers as Edwin S. Porter, Cecil Hepworth, Ferdinand Zecca, and Albert Capellani contributing fairy-tale adaptations in the féerie style or filming versions of popular stage féeries like Le Pied de mouton, Les Sept Châteaux du diable, and La Biche au bois. The leader in the genre, however, remained Méliès, who designed many of his major films as féeries and whose work as a whole is intensely suffused with the genre's influence. Jacques Demy's 1970 film Peau d'Âne also shows a strong féerie influence, using elements of the féerie of the same name by Emile Vanderburch, Evrard Laurencin, and Charles Clairville.

With its explorations into ways of integrating spectacle, comedy, and music in the theatre, the féerie also influenced the development of burlesque and musical comedy. In recollections of his career making films in the Méliès tradition, Ferdinand Zecca reflected on the genre's power: "It's not in the dramas and the acrobatic films that I put my greatest hope. It was in the féeries."

== Notes ==
=== Sources ===
- BnF (2001), "La féerie sur scène: les variantes formelles du conte de fées", Il était une fois...les contes de fées, Bibliothèque nationale de France
- Duggan, Anne E. (28 July 2014), "Donkey Skin: Demy's Fairy-Tale Worlds", The Current, The Criterion Collection
- Gaudreault, André (2011), Film and Attraction: From Kinematography to Cinema, Urbana, IL: University of Illinois Press, p. 171
- Gies, David Thatcher (1988), Theatre and Politics in Nineteenth-Century Spain: Juan De Grimaldi as Impresario and Government Agent, Cambridge: Cambridge University Press, ISBN 978-0-521-34293-3
- Ginisty, Paul (1910), La Féerie, Paris: Louis-Michaud
- Greskovic, Robert (2005), Ballet 101: A Complete Guide to Learning and Loving the Ballet, Pompton Plains, N.J.: Limelight Editions, ISBN 978-0-87910-325-5
- Kessler, Frank (2012), "The Féerie between Stage and Screen", in Gaudreault, André; Dulac, Nicolas; Hidalgo, Santiago (eds.), A Companion to Early Cinema, New York: John Wiley & Sons, pp. 64–79
- Kovács, Katherine Singer (Autumn 1976), "Georges Méliès and the Féerie", Cinema Journal, 16 (1): 1–13, doi:10.2307/1225446, JSTOR 1225446
- Margot, Jean-Michel (2004), Jules Verne en son temps: vu par ses contemporains francophones (1863-1905), Amiens: Encrage
- Margot, Jean-Michel (March 2005), "Jules Verne, playwright", Science Fiction Studies, 1, XXXII (95): 150–162, archived from the original on 20 August 2020
- McCormick, John (1993), Popular Theatres of Nineteenth-Century France, London: Routledge
- Moen, Kristian (2012), Film and Fairy Tales: The Birth of Modern Fantasy, London: I.B. Tauris & Co
- Senelick, Laurence (2000). "Féerie". In Banham, Martin (ed.). The Cambridge Guide to Theatre (2 ed.). Cambridge, UK: Cambridge University Press. ISBN 9780521434379.
- Scholl, Tim (2004), "Sleeping Beauty," a Legend in Progress, New Haven: Yale University Press, ISBN 0-300-12882-7
- Williams, Simon (2010), "Féerie", The Oxford Companion to Theatre and Performance, Oxford Reference, ISBN 978-0-19-957419-3
- Zipes, Jack (2010), The Enchanted Screen: The Unknown History of Fairy-Tale Films, New York: Routledge

=== Further reading ===
- Roxane Martin, La féerie romantique sur les scènes parisiennes (1791-1864), Honoré Champion, Paris, 2007
