= Plot armor =

Plot device wherein a fictional character is preserved from harm

Plot armor is a narrative trope or cliché wherein a major character in a story, particularly the protagonist, is preserved from harm (either explicitly or implicitly) due to their survival being necessary for the plot to proceed. The Oxford English Dictionary identified the term as originating in the 2000s, with its first reported use on the Usenet forum alt.games.dur-trs-trap. The term is often used negatively to criticize scenes in which characters face seemingly mortal danger, when it is obvious to the audience that they will survive such scenes. In other cases, plot armor simply refers to the plot device of endowing a character with invulnerability or immortality.

Within works of created media, elements of the story may provide an explanation for why the protagonist is protected from injury or death. Various iterations of James Bond have been cited as classic examples of plot armor, where movie-goers fully expect Bond to survive each film.

While protagonists and heroes are commonly shielded by plot armor, this can be subverted by their sudden deaths serving as a plot twist or the reveal of a false protagonist. The killings and mutilations of main characters, such as Ned Stark, within A Game of Thrones by George R. R. Martin and its television adaptation have been considered examples of such twists, where their role in the plot seemed to protect them from harm, making these violent moments all the more shocking for the audience. On the other hand, an apocalyptic battle at the end of the same series, where many major characters narrowly escaped harm, has sometimes been described as "plot armor", suggesting that some fans felt the miraculous turn of events was disappointingly far-fetched or implausible.

== See also ==
- Killing off
- Deus ex machina
