= Le Château des cœurs =

Le Château des cœurs (French pronunciation: [lə ʃato de kœʁ], The Castle of Hearts) is a féerie by Gustave Flaubert, published in 1880 in the journal La Vie moderne, under the editorship of Émile Bergerat.
