= The Vanishing Lady (illusion) =

Illusion trick

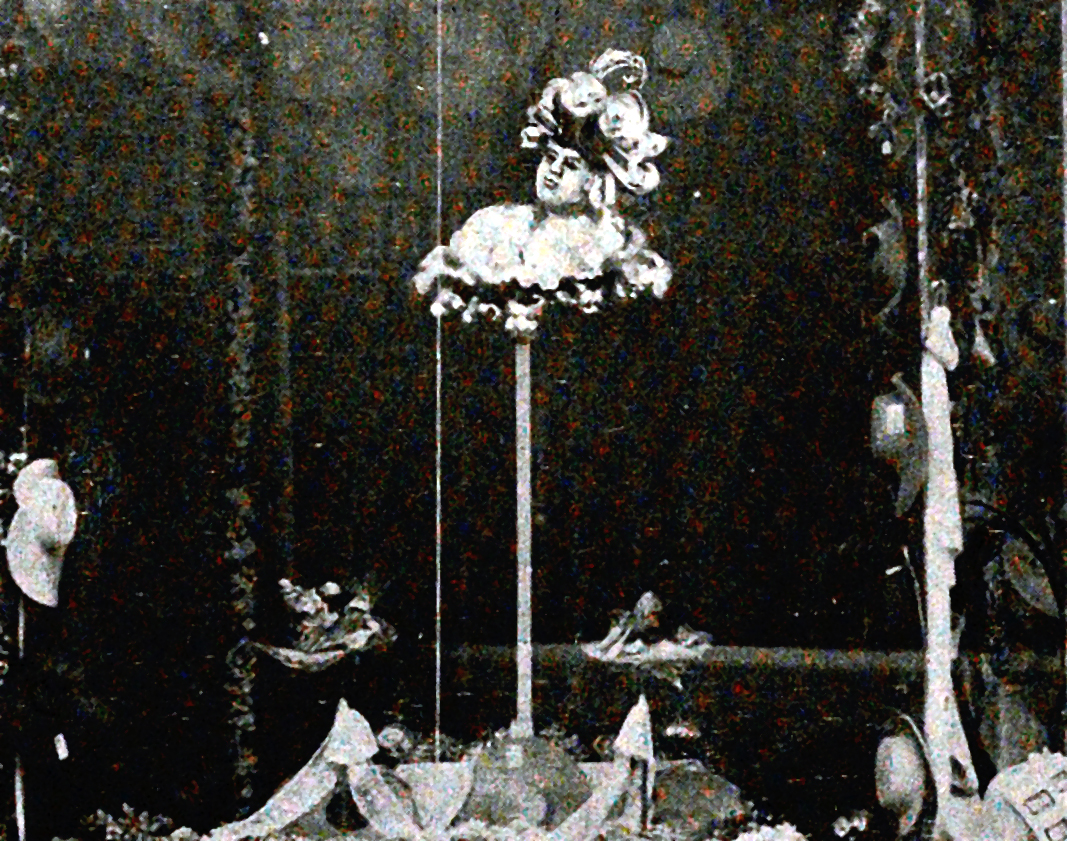
The Vanishing Lady.

The Vanishing Lady is a window display created by Charles Morton for a Sacramento department store in 1898. L. Frank Baum celebrated it in 1900 in a book of window decorations published the same year as his novel The Wonderful Wizard of Oz.

The illusion consists of a bust of a living woman, appearing above a pedestal, then seeming to disappear inside it, only reappearing wearing a new outfit. Similar to the "Sphinx" illusion created in London in 1865, the installation is based on an optical illusion using mirrors. The popular stage illusion of the same name, created in Paris in 1886 and later revived by Georges Méliès in L'Escamotage d'une dame at the Théâtre Robert-Houdin, inspired the name and theme of the installation.

At the first level, the attraction described by Baum bears witness to changing consumer trends at the end of the 19th century, particularly in the United States, and to the status of women in society at the time.

Baum presents this device as a model of what a display window should be, and it is also a frequently cited example of spontaneous intermediality the adoption of pre-existing cultural series by an emerging medium to create new attractions. This text examines the use of stage illusions in storefronts, combined with references to the film industry, which was emerging at the time, using well-known illusions. This convergence indicates the technical exchange that existed at the time between the performing arts, cinema, and shop window design. It raises the question of whether the consumers of urban spectacle at the time were naive or fascinated by the processes used. Baum's interest in this attraction also reveals the connection between this commercial aspect of his work, before he gained recognition as a specialist in children's fairy tales, and his later works, particularly the Oz books. Several critics have noted the internal coherence between Baum's concept of window art and the themes he later developed in his practice of intermediality, notably in his cinematic experiments, and transmediality, which involves the coherent development of a single theme across several media.

Finally, the convergence of the theme of the disappearing woman across several media raised questions about the meaning of this theme, as well as interpretations of the relationship to women inherent in illusion and cinema performances. This is particularly evident in Baum's work, known for his proximity to feminist theses.

== From theater to shop windows ==
Baum's transition from theater to commerce to display science came when there was a growing interest in window displays in the U.S., and he adopted these techniques from the theater world.

=== Development of window art ===
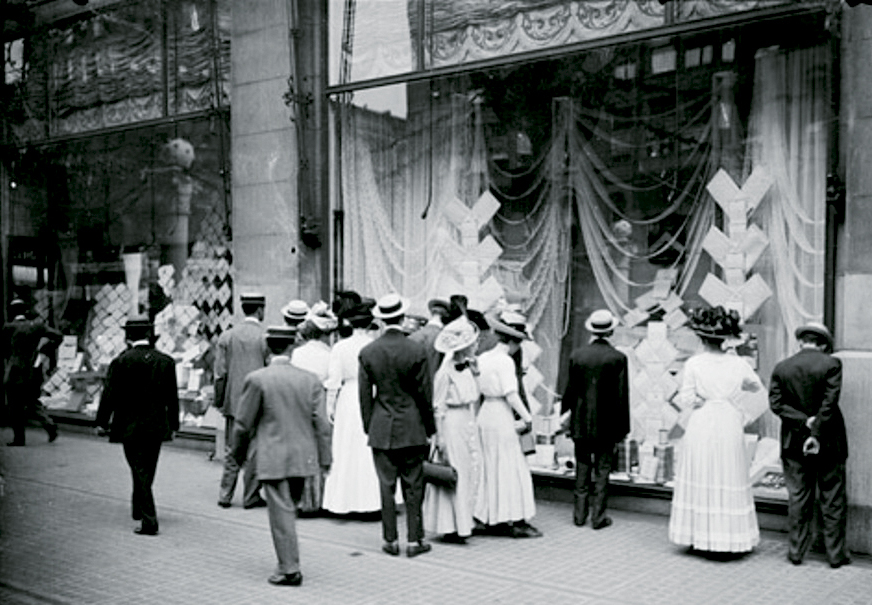
Vitrine de Marshall Field's c. 1910.

Until the late 1880s, visual advertising was not widely accepted and was often associated with the circus. Before 1885, there were no window displays to speak of. Electric lighting was poor, glass quality was low, and products were piled up in shop windows or, weather permitting, in the street in front of the stores. In many cases, stores displayed nothing in their windows because they believed that showing their products there might have an undesirable effect or did not know how to arrange them.

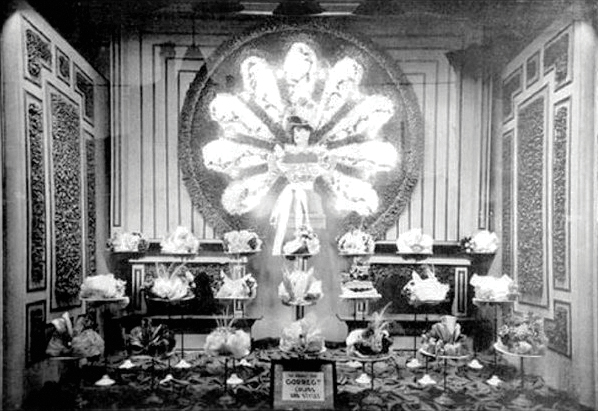
Electrified hat showcase (c. 1900).

By contrast, by the early 1890s, window displays, especially in department stores, were designed with architectural precision to be appropriately arranged, according to an 1892 trade publication. This transformation was part of a wider context: department stores, aiming to become places of festive consumption, were transforming their appearance and adopting new technologies that emphasized color and light, thanks in particular to the use of glass and electricity. As William Leach points out, mirrors of all kinds made their appearance, helping to create an illusion of abundance by infinitely multiplying the reflection of goods and customers. Additionally, exterior window displays were enhanced by the use of color and electric lighting, which benefited from new glass manufacturing techniques that enabled the production of less expensive, larger, stronger, and clearer panes.

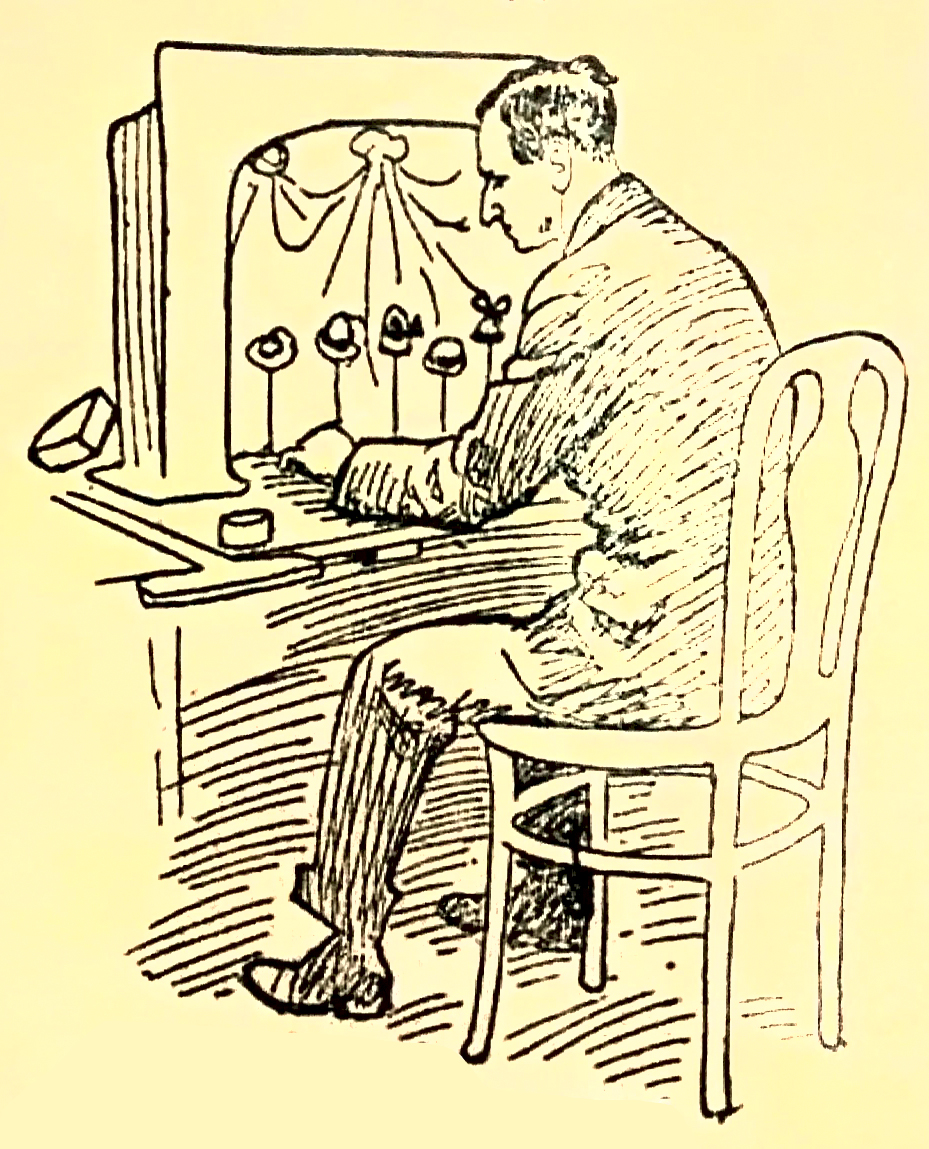
Shopkeeper Oscar Lunddkvist composing a window display. Swedish press illustration (1919).

These innovations led to the development of the new profession of window dresser, which was supposed to combine "artistic feeling" with "inventive genius" and "mechanical skill", not to mention "business sense". In 1889, J. H. Wilson Marriott published what he claimed to be the first American manual ever compiled for window dressers. From 1893 onwards, Harry Harman published the first American periodical entirely dedicated to window dressers in Louisville. Emily Orr observed that the trade was then almost exclusively male. She noted a gendered dichotomy between male producers of window displays and female consumers of the products displayed there. (Note: According to Fiona Maxwell, on the other hand, such an approach is too schematic: not all target consumers are women, and there are women window-shoppers, albeit fewer in number than men, particularly in city-center department stores.) This development of the art of display was part of a boom in product presentation techniques that lasted until the late 1890s, including the artistic poster, the painted billboard, and the electric sign. Arthur Fraser was hired by Harry Gordon Selfridge, the manager of Marshall Field's, in 1895 to lead window decoration. In the late 1890s, he designed themed shop windows that resembled miniature theaters facing the sidewalk. The staging was so elaborate that the unveiling of six red-themed window displays in 1897 sparked a "red epidemic". According to Cesare Silla, the shop windows of this period were perceived as veritable stages, on which the drama of social life was portrayed, due to their representation of social life and a new urban identity. This led shopkeepers to draw inspiration from the mechanical means used by the theater. The analogy with theater is made by the frequent use of curtains, which are raised in the morning to allow a view of the display and lowered in the evening. The analogy with theater is made by the frequent use of curtains, which are raised in the morning to allow a view of the display and lowered in the evening. The theatrical practice also inspires the staging techniques of the showcase, which incorporates some of the developments of Victorian theater, which, thanks to a design emphasizing flexibility, aims to strike the audience with frequent changes of scenery, in particular through the use of mechanical means to create illusion, such as rail-mounted scenery or trapdoors.

From theater hatches to shop-window traps.

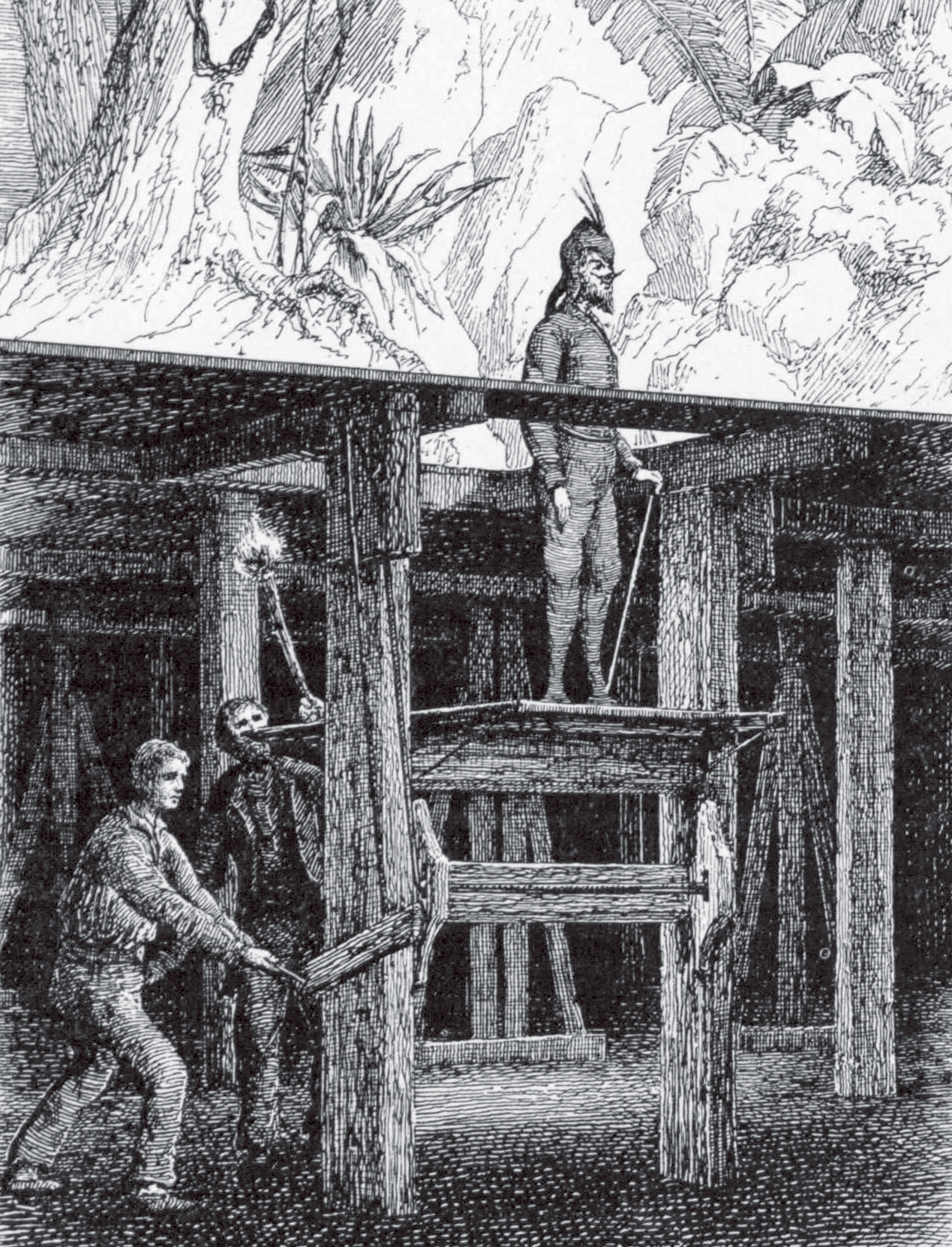
Theater trapdoor.

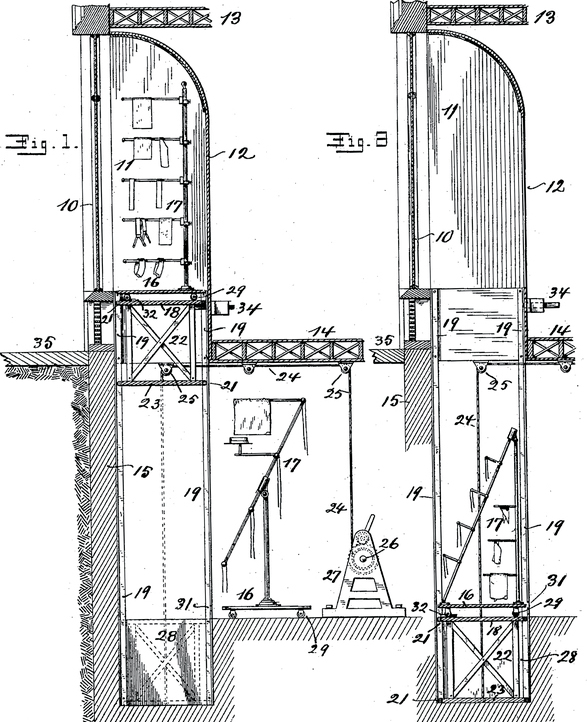
Showcase hatch.

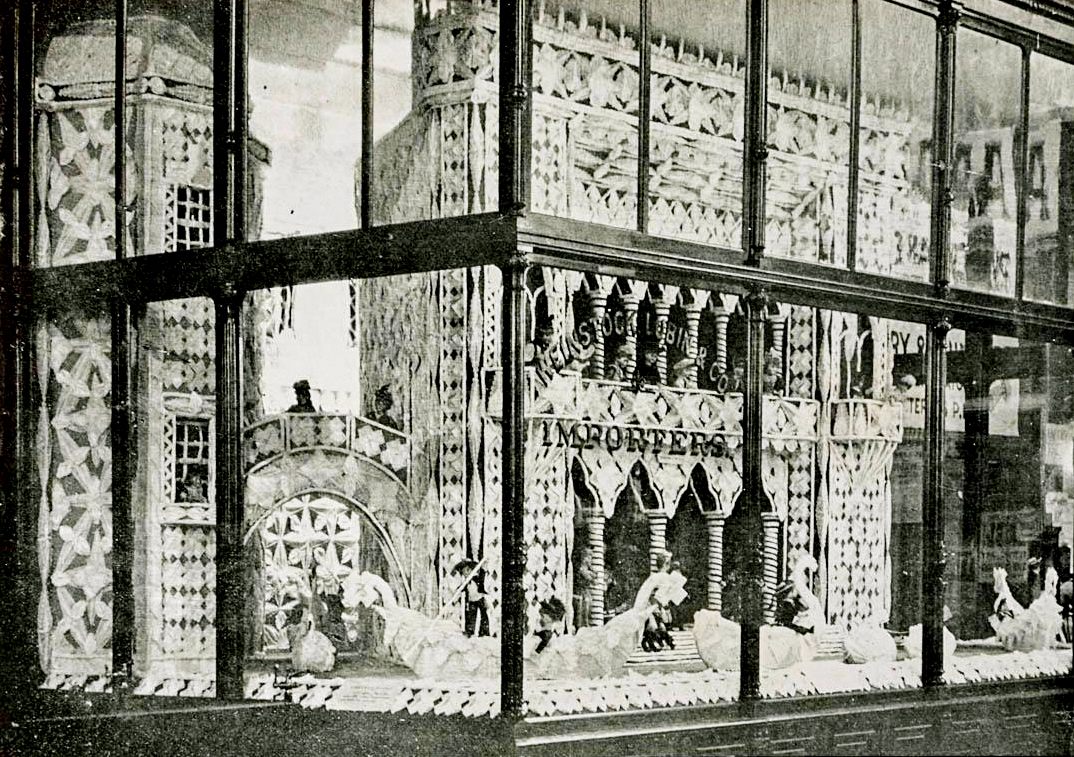
A Scene in Venice, Charles Morton's window display for Weinstock's department store in Sacramento.

Fiona Maxwell notes that while the development of window displays was primarily driven by commercial imperatives, they were nonetheless perceived by contemporaries as a new form of "practical art", combining the pursuit of profit with that of artistic value, and considers that "the first window displays can be counted among the cultural phenomena symptomatic of turn-of-the-century American mass culture, centered on the justification of amusement for its own sake". Maxwell adds that "theater, vaudeville, ballrooms, circuses, amusement parks and storefronts all contributed to a mass culture characterized by audience participation, mechanical amusements, exotic settings and a sense of wonder". She concludes that "far from highlighting a culture based on the acceptance and promotion of greed, the shop windows [of the period] reveal a consumer culture intertwined with a sense of artistry and a taste for amusement, functioning as much as a form of popular entertainment as a form of advertising".

=== Baum's journey ===
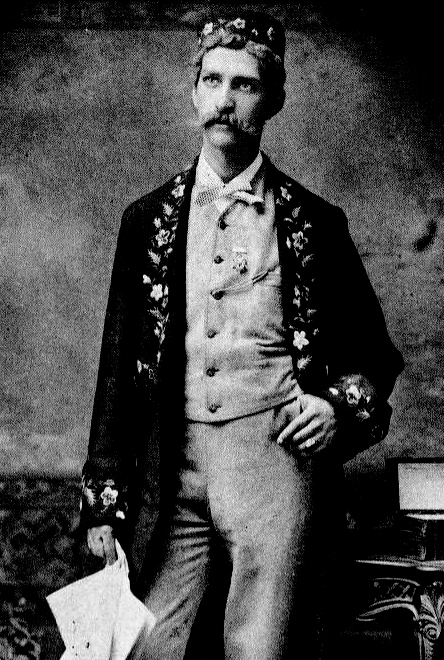
Frank Baum in 1882, in a play of his composition, The Maid of Arran

Frank Baum was born in 1856 in a village in New York State. Unattracted by his father's industrial and financial activities, he developed a passion for the theater in his youth, writing plays, producing them and acting in their leading roles.

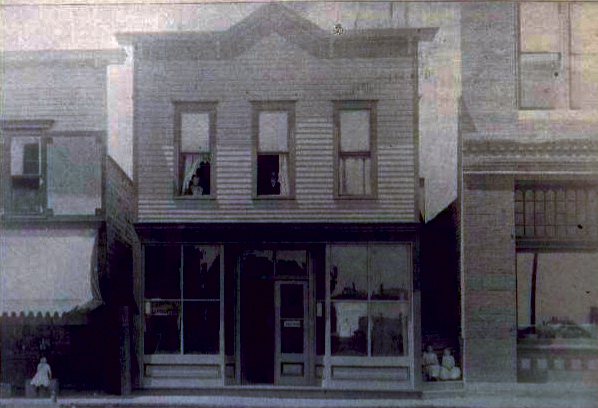
A Scene in Venice, Charles Morton's window display for Weinstock's department store in Sacramento.

Married in 1882, he published his first book in 1886, devoted to the breeding of Hamburg chickens. (Note: The publication of this book was part of a promotional strategy comparable to that used later for window art. Baum began by creating an association of Hamburg hen enthusiasts, which enabled him to compile lists of enthusiasts and sell the product of his own breeding. He then launched The Poultry World, a specialist periodical that established his competence and enabled him to promote his hens. His articles were later included in a monographic work that established him as an expert.) In 1888, L. Frank Baum opened Baum's Bazaar, a low-priced goods store in Aberdeen, South Dakota, modeled after Woolworth's, which was founded in 1879 in Utica. By 1891, a Dakota economic recession led him to move to Chicago and take a job as a salesman. He often helped rural hardware dealers improve the presentation of the products they were selling.

Chicago was a pioneer in the consumerist transformation during the preparation of the 1893 Columbian Exposition. This transformation was characterized by the use of electric lighting and larger sheets of glass for shop windows. Glass began to be used in department stores like Marshall Field's. (Note: Large-scale window displays, known as "French windows", were introduced to the United States in 1846 by the New York department store A.T. Stewart, nicknamed the Marble Palace. Stewart's department store, known as the Marble Palace, where they were one of the main attractions, and which Philip Hone, the former mayor of New York, considered an "extravagance". At the time, shopkeepers felt that the advantage of displaying their products in windows was uncertain.)

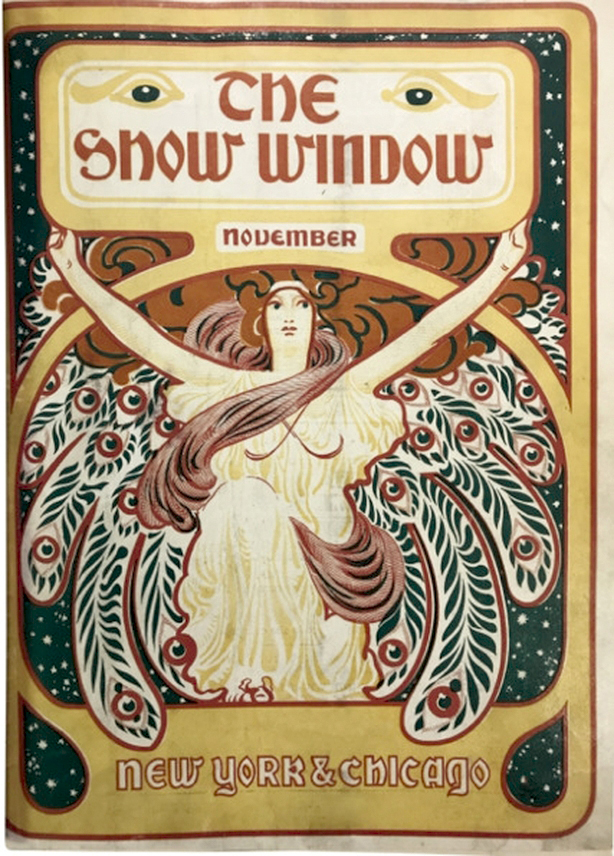
The Show Window, cover of first issue, November 1897.

Baum was motivated to find a job that would allow him to settle down and stop traveling. As a salesman, he realized that many shopkeepers had not yet grasped the concept of effectively presenting their products through 'staging', proclaimed himself the "grand master" of the new art of window dressing. In November 1897, founded The Show Window, a sixty-page monthly magazine for window dressers (Note: The magazine still exists at the beginning of the 21st century. It is published under the title VMSD in Cincinnati.) that he considered an art journal. It was illustrated with numerous photographs, many taken by Baum. The following year, in 1898, he founded the first national association of window dressers, which quickly grew to two hundred members making him a nationally recognized authority on the subject, long before he became even more notorious for his books for children. Baum explains to his readers that the function of a shop window is not to illuminate the interior, but to sell the products. (Note: Baum's interest in the theatricalization of shop windows is often compared with that of architect Frederick Kiesler, another man of the theater, who, in a 1930 book, evokes the "dream of a kinetic shop window "44 driven by the consumer45,46,47.) One of the first pieces of advice he gives his readers is to hire an actor, playing the role of a wealthy flâneur, who, by stopping in front of the window to observe it, will attract the imitation of other passers-by. The Show Window, described by Harry Gordon Selfridge as "indispensable" reading, reached a print run of tens of thousands of copies within a few months. As William Leach summarizes,

"The Show Window was at the forefront of a new merchandising movement designed to stimulate year-round consumer desire. In this context, he was instrumental in changing the way products were presented. On page after page, he recommended new tactics to grab consumers' attention, particularly those that were Baum's strong personal preference, electrified 'spectacular' displays of spinning stars, "disappearing women", mechanical butterflies, spinning wheels, glowing globes of light - anything to make the customer 'look at the window'!"

All in all, this editorial project expresses Baum's perception of in-store shopping as a form of entertainment, a cultural event.

Showcases from The Show Window.

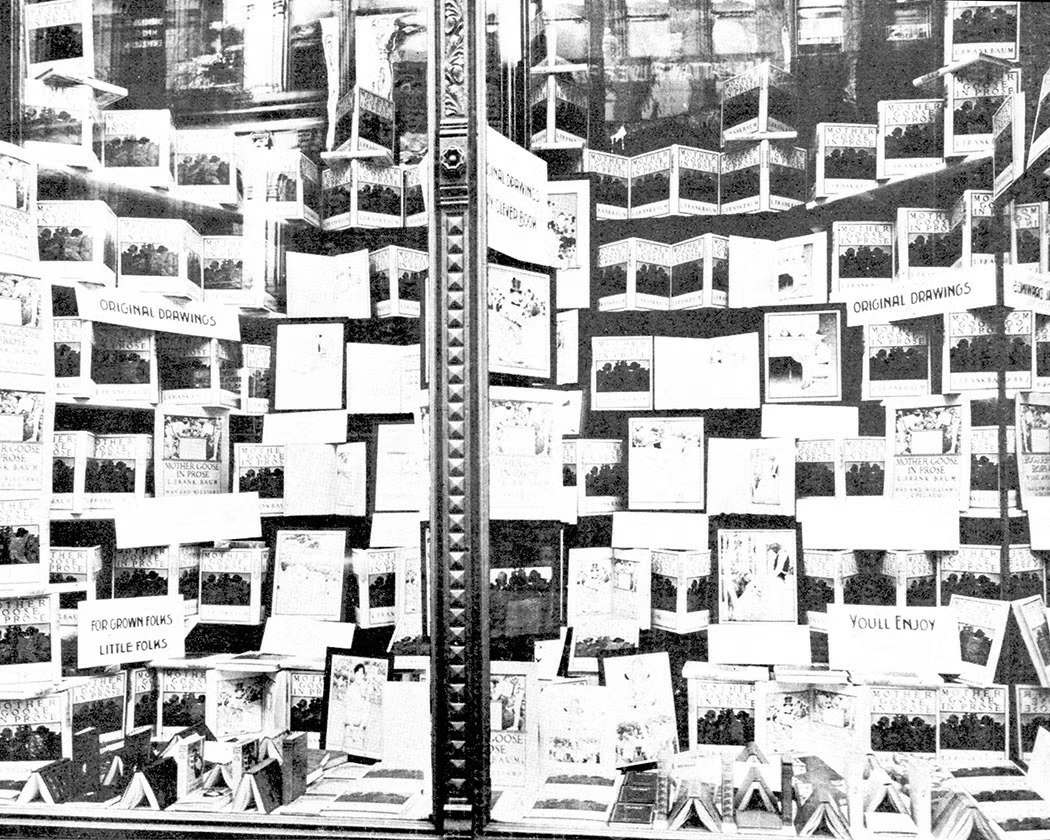
Books at Carson Pirie Scott & Co.

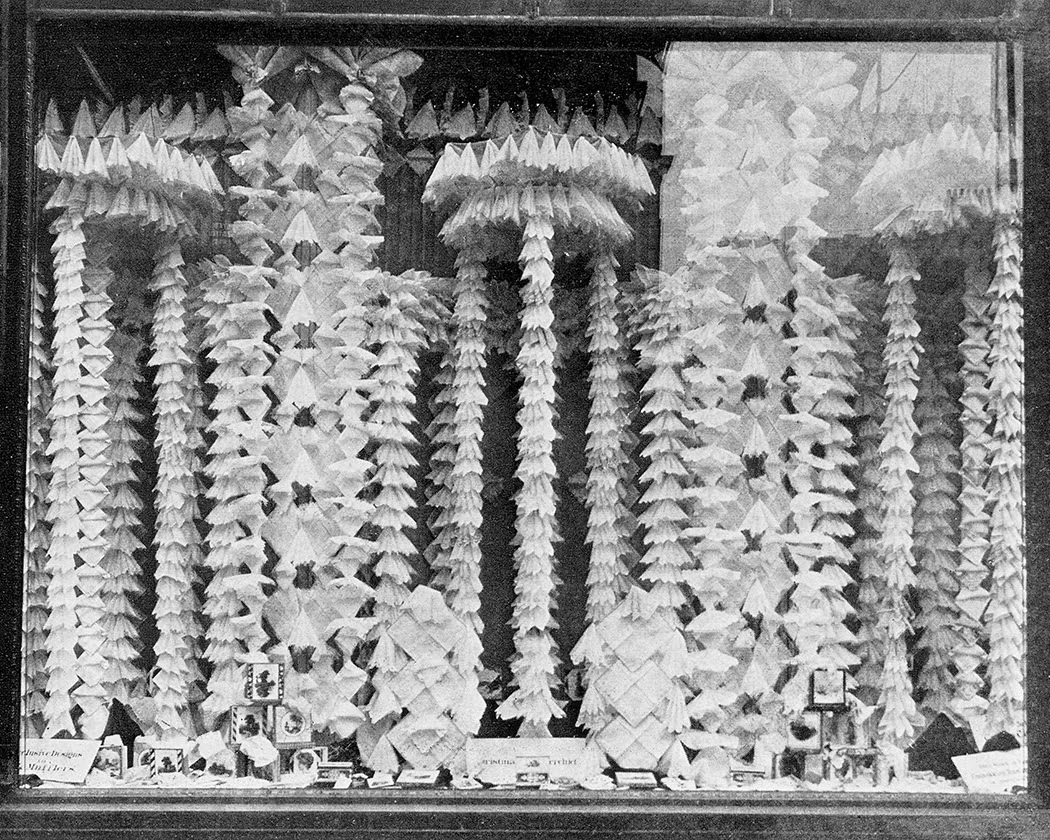
Handkerchiefs at Marshall Field's.

== Mechanical showcase ==
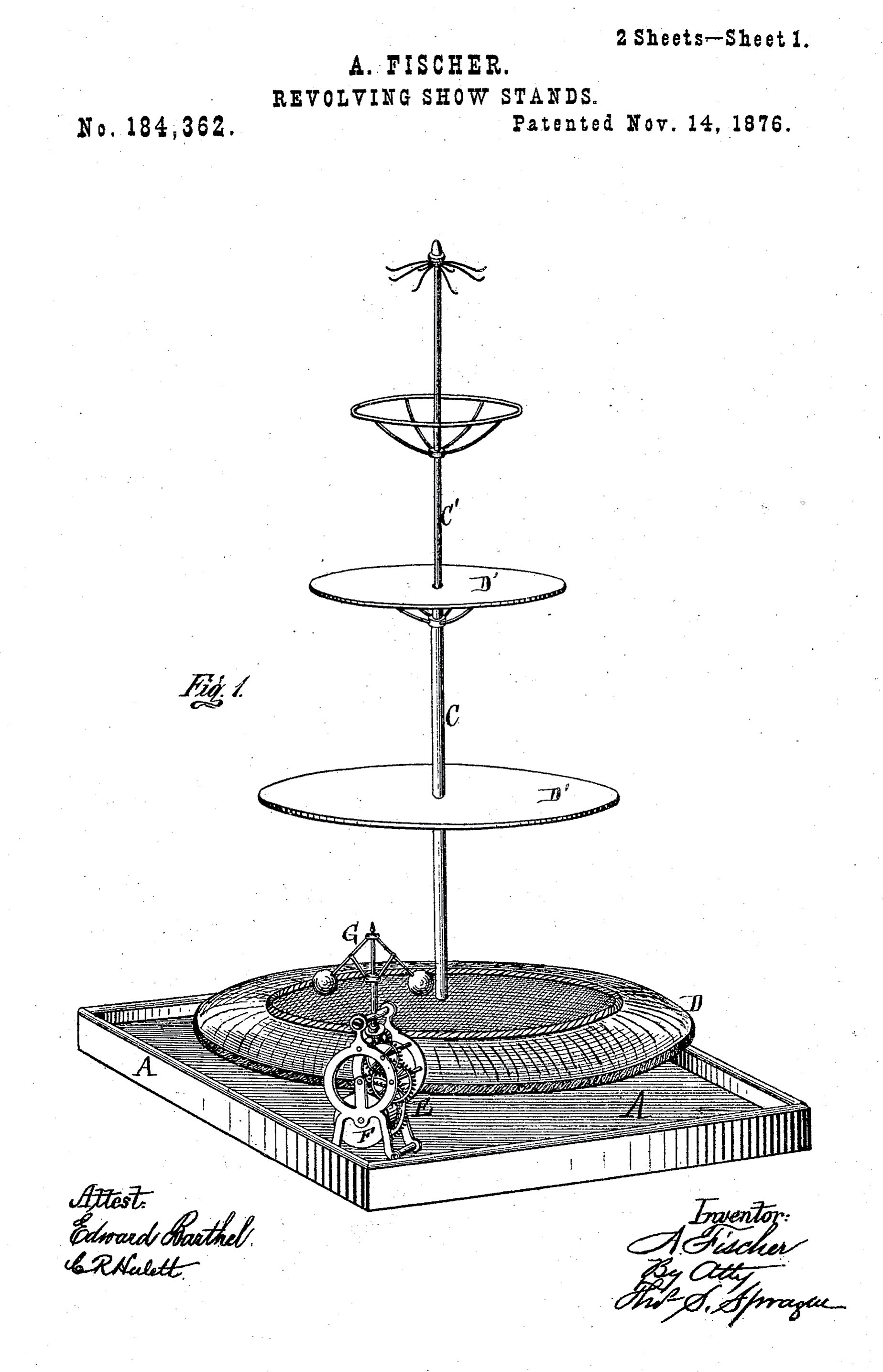
American patent for a rotating display unit (1876).

Baum's interest in mechanical window displays was aligned with the tastes of his time. In Au Bonheur des Dames, Anne Friedberg evokes Émile Zola's comparison of the department store with a "machine, operating at high pressure, and whose movement would have reached as far as the stalls" which, "with mechanical rigor", stunned customers with merchandise and threw them into the checkout. From the outset, the development of window displays in American stores was associated with the use of mechanical devices. In 1876, Albert Fischer filed a patent for a rotating window display whose main purpose was to attract the attention of passers-by with its mechanism. In 1881, the New York store Ehrich presented a striking Christmas window display with a doll circus theme - probably the first mechanized window display in the United States. In 1883, Macy's in turn presented a steam-powered toy window for Christmas. In the years that followed, window displays using mechanical animation developed, with the triple aim of attracting passers-by with their movement, arousing their curiosity to understand how they worked, and, in the case of rotating devices, showing different aspects of the products in the same window. In 1893, Robert Faries sold a rotating bust platform to shopkeepers, which "gives the appearance of life to a shop window" and "never fails to attract attention ".

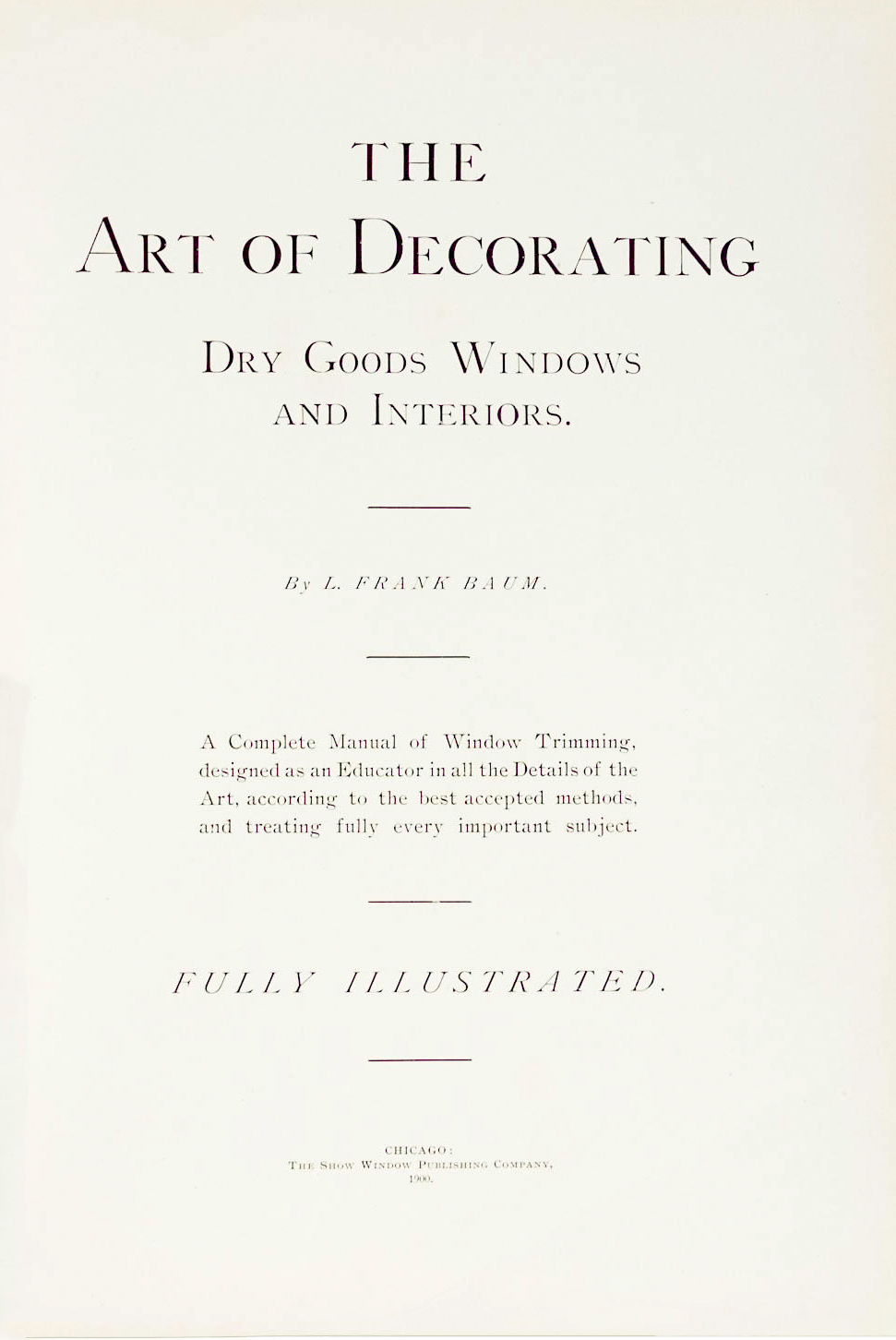
Title page of Baum's book on display

In 1900, the same year he published The Wonderful Wizard of Oz, (Note: Several explanations have been proposed for the link between The Art of Window Decoration and The Wizard of Oz. The Emerald City could be a huge shop window; it could have been inspired by the Midway Plaisance at the 1893 World's Fair, itself understood as a Midwestern shop window; the witch Glinda could be a mannequin; but most exegetes see instead the Scarecrow or the Tin Woodsman as mannequins inspired by the shop windows described by Baum.) the work that would make him famous, Frank Baum also published The Art of Decorating Dry Goods Windows and Interiors (Note: In the United States, the term dry goods refers to textile products, clothing and, more generally, products that do not contain liquids and are not sold in hardware or grocery stores.) often considered, wrongly, (Note: In 1889, J. H. Wilson Marriott published what he claimed to be the first American manual ever compiled for window dressers, and from 1893 onwards, Harry Harman published in Louisville the first American periodical aimed entirely at the window dresser.) to be the first American work entirely devoted to this subject.

Using diagrams, photographs, and descriptions, Baum presents the means available to the window dresser to achieve what academic Stuart Culver analyzed in 1988 as "witchcraft" effects, akin to the "irruption of theater" into the streetscape. According to Baum, the shop window's function is to tell a "readable story" to the "crowd of passers-by" to "arouse their greed" and "induce a sale".

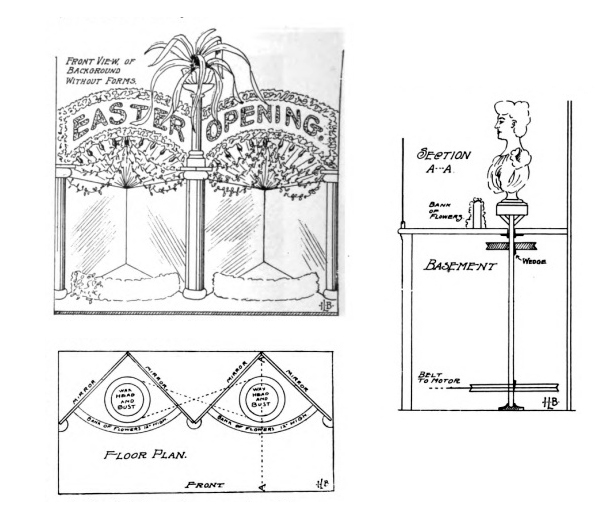
In this installation by Baum, motor-driven busts are endlessly reflected in mirrors.

As Stuart Culver points out, Baum equates the aesthetic interest of showcases with the use of mechanical devices. He states:

"Clever and observant window dressers have found that the secret of successful window displays is to have a mechanical device in the background that attracts attention, and then to present the products in such an ingenious way that people notice their excellence and want to buy them."

According to Baum, this is due to psychological motivation:

"People are naturally curious. They will always stop to examine something that moves and take pleasure in studying the mechanism or trying to understand how the effect was achieved."

Rachel Bowlby, referring to the headless mannequins in the window of the department store described by Zola's Au Bonheur des Dames points out that the use of such devices is characteristic of "the fragmentation and objectification of women in department stores organized into departments" and Stuart Culver notes that "fragments of human form", in particular mechanical mannequins, (Note: Headless mannequins to represent the shape of clothes were in use as early as the mid-nineteenth century, but it wasn't until manufacturers exhibited them at the 1894 World's Fair that mannequins with faces, eyelashes and hair began to be used.) are a recurring feature of Baum's treatise; they constitute the "essential tool" of the window dresser, "a machine that simultaneously attracts the gaze of passers-by and directs it towards the products on display" by telling them a "legible story". (Note: Louisa Iarocci also notes that the use of partial figures offering a fragmentary representation of the body is characteristic of this early period of display techniques, particularly in millinery and hosiery, with priority given to variety and abundance.) Despite Baum's assertion that mechanical devices sell products, he nevertheless acknowledges, at least implicitly, according to Culver, that there may be an "impossibility of maintaining the additional presence of theatrical machinery properly in the service of the needs of commerce", as these devices primarily promote themselves. Culver sees an admission of this when Baum recommends that window dressers advertise their forthcoming mechanical windows in advance, for example by displaying a sign saying: "Watch this window".

Mechanical showcases for millinery items.

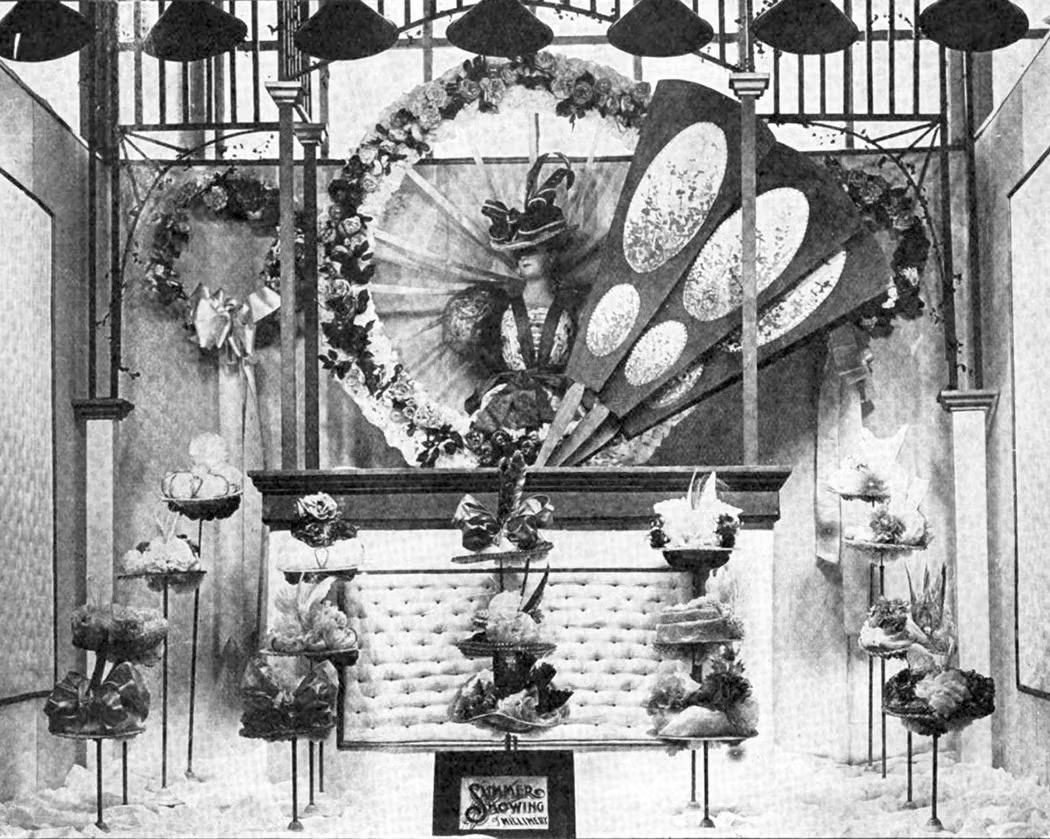
Fan.

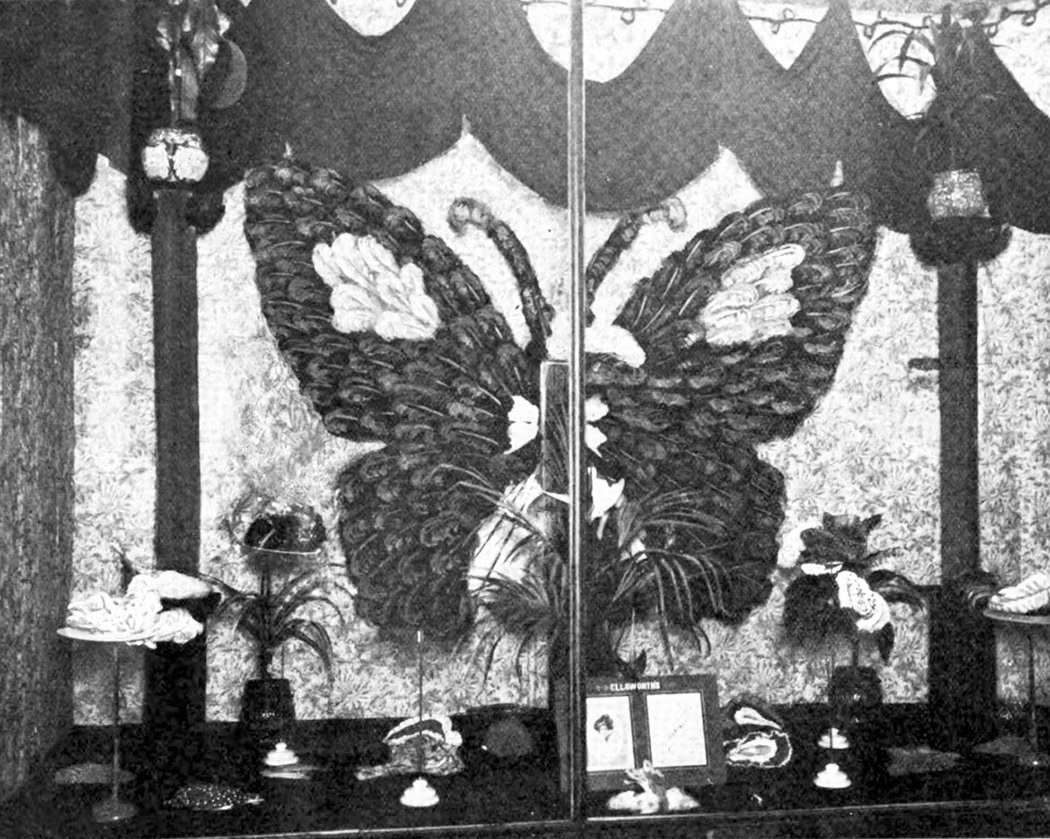
Papillon.

== Illusion showcase ==
Baum's illusion showcase is based on a fairground tradition of illusions, originating with the "Sphinx", a trick created in the UK in 1865 and popularized in the USA as a fixed fairground installation by Henry Roltair.

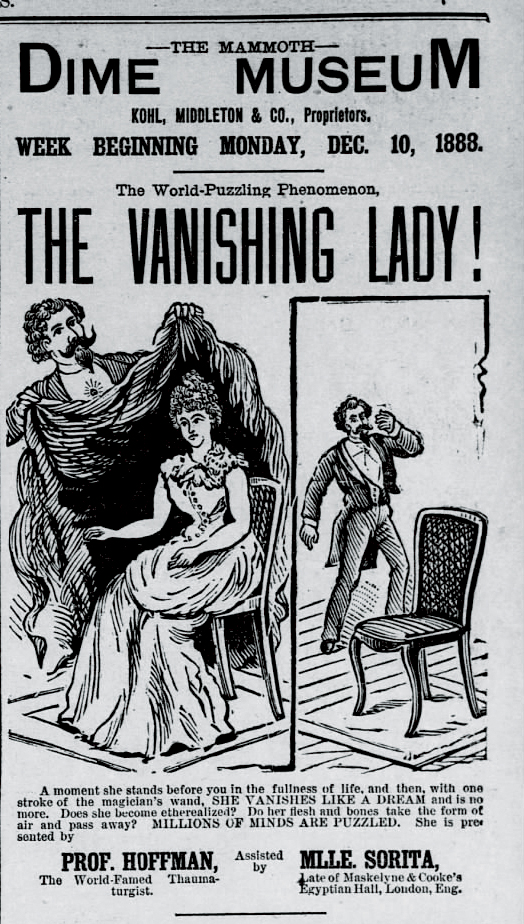
Mechanical showcases for millinery items.

=== A fairground heritage ===
According to Baum, one of the best ways of attracting shoppers' attention is to present an illusionary centerpiece in the window, a process he traces back to dime museums and fairground attractions (entresorts). (Note: Baum uses the term sideshow to designate the tents that accompanied circuses and barracks at fairs, carnivals or amusement parks. This term corresponds to the French term entresort, which designates the barracks where the phenomena offered to the curiosity of onlookers were presented, and from which one could only enter and leave81. Jules Vallès gives the following definition of an entresort: "the theater, canvas or plank, carriage or shack in which the monsters stand [...] You go in, you come out, that's it". Agnès Pierron, on the other hand, considers the circus to be a sideshow, in which one simply enters and exits, with no provision for sitting.) In the nineteenth century, fairground attractions were a "feast for the eyes", for the spectacle not only of monstrosities and oddities, but also of trickery and optical illusions, with the "American Museum" founded in 1841 by Phineas Taylor Barnum becoming one of the country's most popular attractions. In this regard, Courtine evokes Walter Benjamin's analysis of the development of the "pilgrimage of merchandise", particularly in the context of universal exhibitions such as the one in Chicago in 1893, which, along with the entresorts, form a moment in the development of the "pleasure industry", between the funfair and the film industry.

=== Illusion and prestidigitation ===
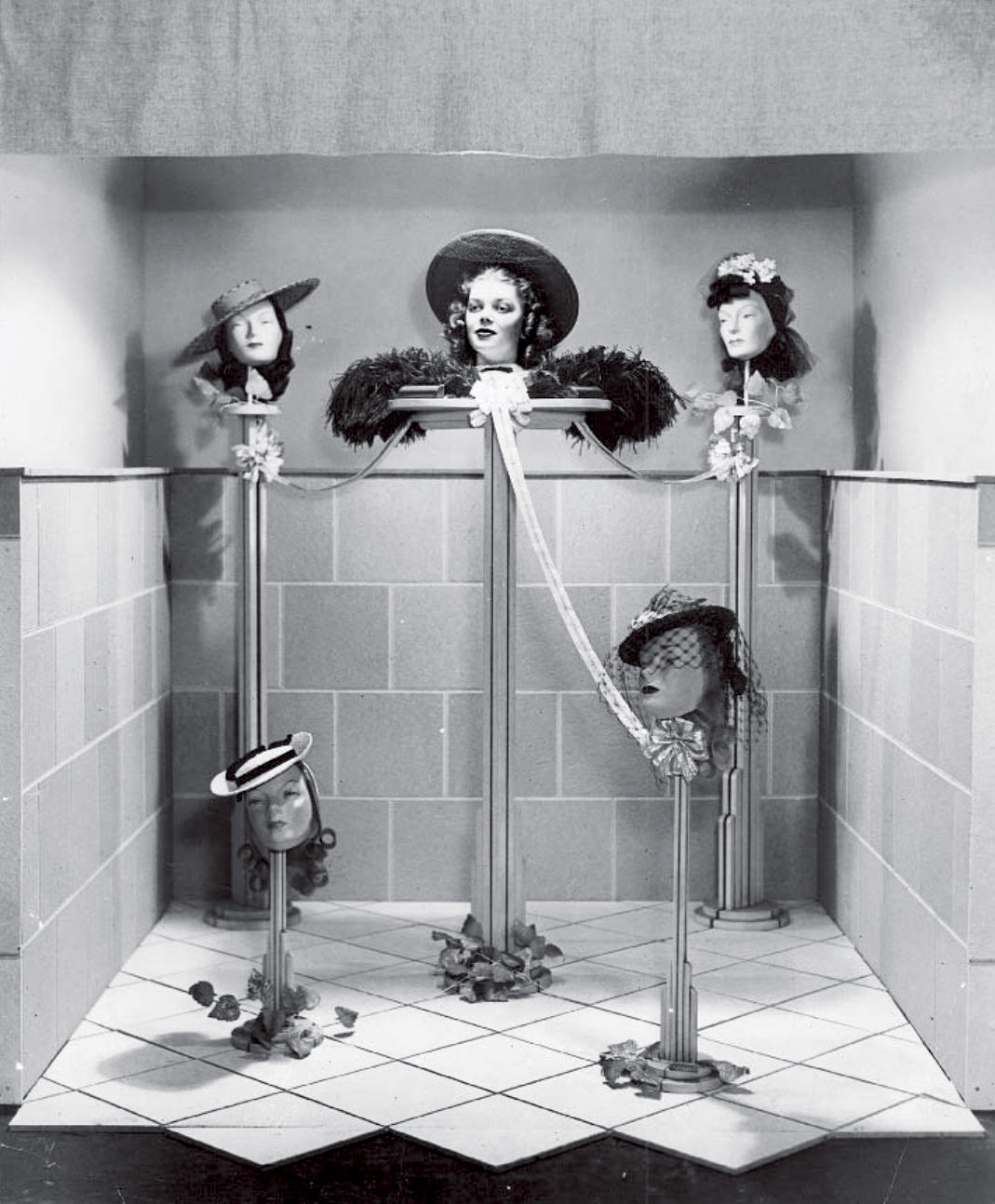
Window illusion in Syracuse, circa 1947.

In 1903 a manual for window dressers points out that these illusions were drawn from the register of the magic show and consist of an arrangement of screens and mirrors designed to deceive the observer's gaze and that, "since they always form an attraction of great interest", they were often used as "special features" of the window display layout. The term illusionist is opposed to prestidigitateur: the practice is detached from the dexterity of the operator, from prestidigitation in the literal sense. The observer becomes "the locus and producer of the sensation". It is no longer a question of applying the principle of "misleading the mind", of diverting attention, advocated by Robert-Houdin, but of creating a repeatable illusion, thanks to a "perceptual out-of-field" and within the framework of a scenic device specially designed for the purpose, of which the illusion showcase is the heir. As James Cook notes, the opposition between illusionism and prestidigitation at the end of the 19th century encompassed several aspects: disenchantment, an explicit detachment from the supernatural, the apprehension of illusionism as a form of scientific research, and a preference for urban public amusements over those traditionally confined to a more intimate circle. The aesthetics of illusionism were also central to the development of cinema styles and techniques, which it influences in parallel with showcase art and shares some of the latter's issues.

=== Baum's example ===
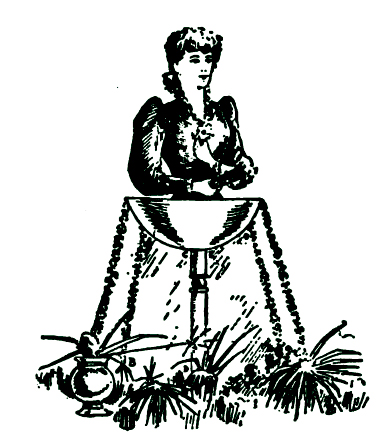
Window illusion described by Baum.

Baum gives the following example of such an illusion:

"It consists of a beautiful young woman whose lower body is invisible to the spectators and whose upper body seems to rest on a pedestal and have an independent existence. The effect of the illusion is very striking. It is produced in a very simple manner: A wooden pedestal is arranged according to the diagram [opposite], the upper part consisting of a hollow bowl resting on a solid pilaster and a sufficient portion of the upper part of the bowl being cut away, so as to allow the young woman who is part of the illusion to stand behind the pilaster and [in appearance] in the upper part of the pedestal."

Baum's description of the device omits a fundamental point: the use of two mirrors and the application of the optical principle whereby the angle of reflection is equal to the angle of incidence. It is in fact two mirrors inclined at 45 degrees, reflecting the side walls so as to hide the central part, that make this illusion possible. Incidentally, as Rebecca Loncraine points out, the context of this illusion is explained by Baum himself in an article in The Show Window, where he refers to the famous trick of the "talking head", which appears to be placed on a table under which no body can be seen.

=== The Sphinx and its variants ===
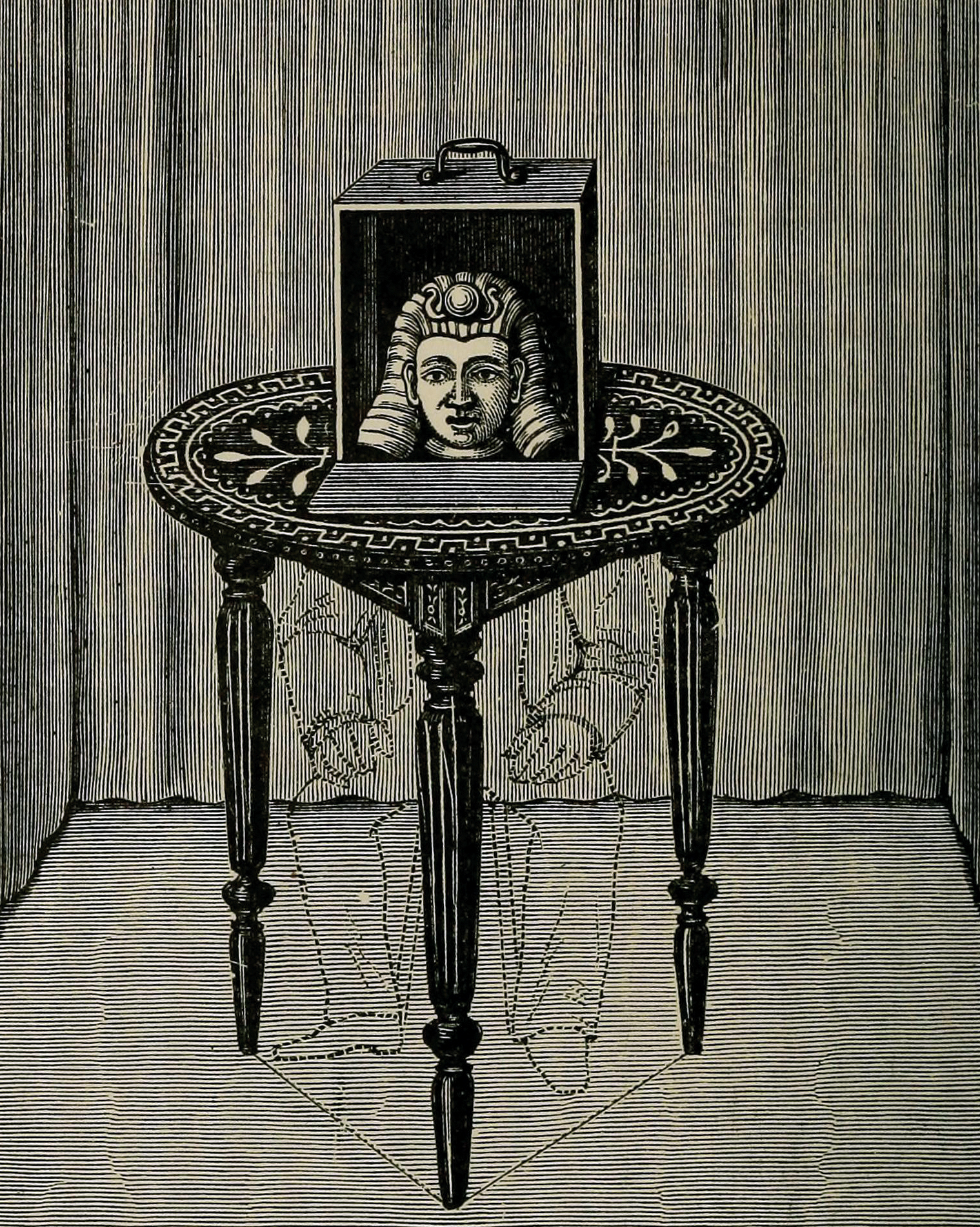
The "Sphinx" illusion presented in 1865 by Colonel Stodare.

This device, designed by Thomas Tobin, was first used in London in 1865 by the English magician and ventriloquist Joseph Stoddart, known as Colonel Stodare, in a trick called "The Sphinx", in which two mirrors tilted at 45 degrees conceal the body of the spectator, whose head is all that can be seen. This illusion has given rise to numerous adaptations, including the "talking head" and the "half-woman". (Note: In 1865, the Hanlon brothers, famous English acrobats, bought the trick from Colonel Stodare for 5,000 francs, with the intention of presenting it in the United States in shows organized by Barnum. Barnum, to whom they presented the attraction, showed interest, believing at first that it was a mechanical head whose voice came from a tube. He then bought an identical trick directly in England and introduced it in New York, with the Hanlon brothers operating it outside the city.)

Female variants of Sphinx.

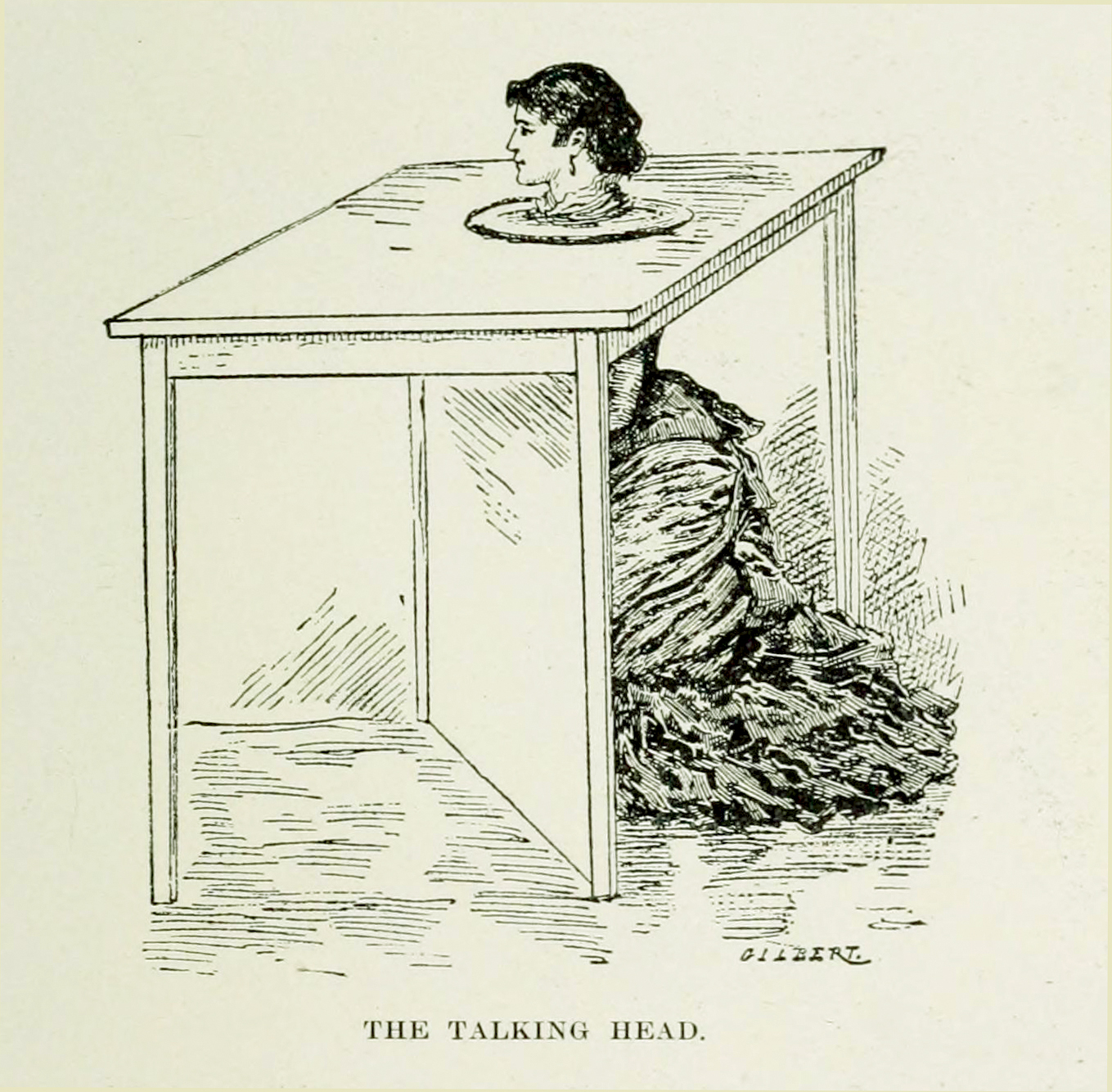
"Talking head".

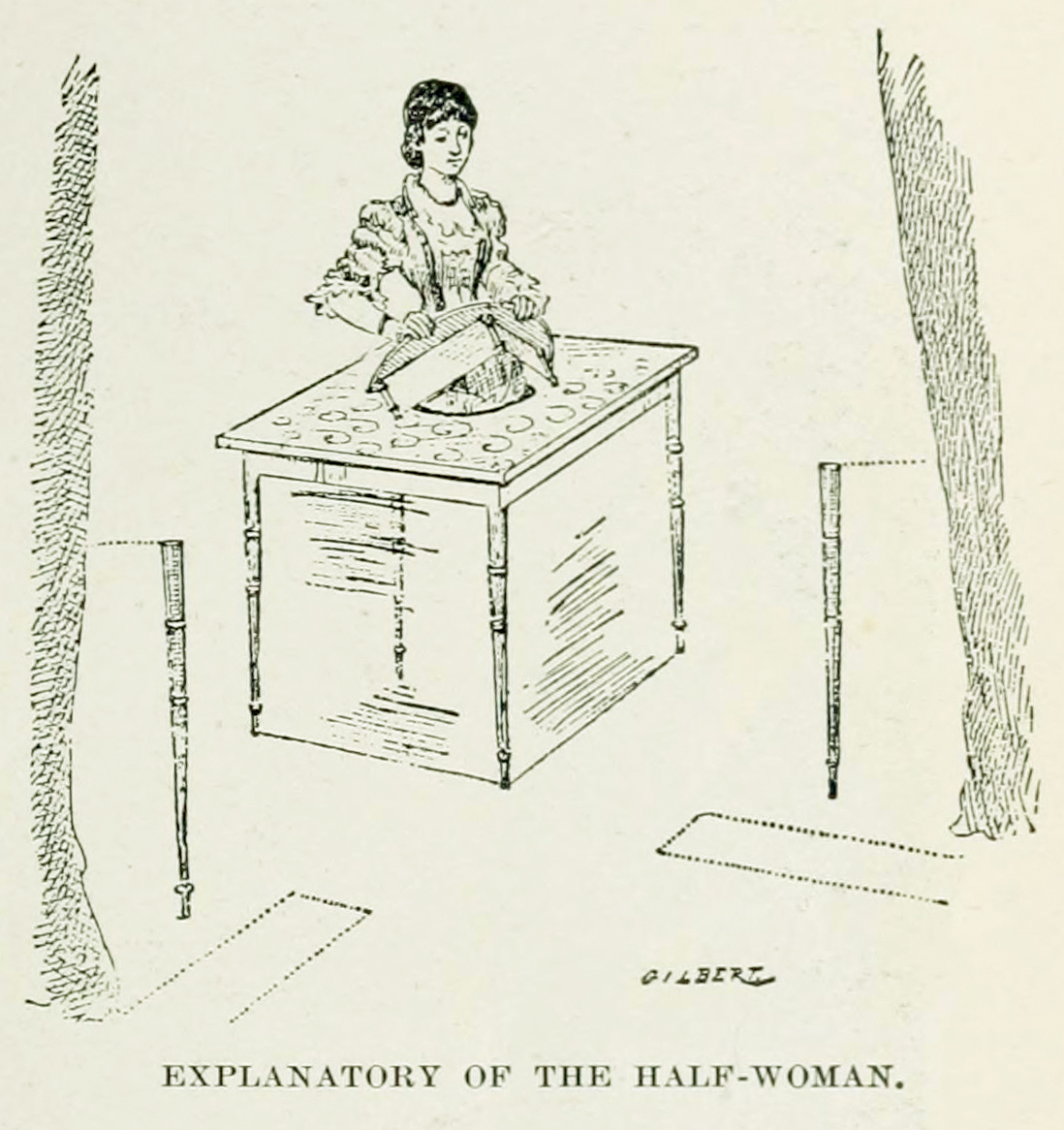
"Half-woman".

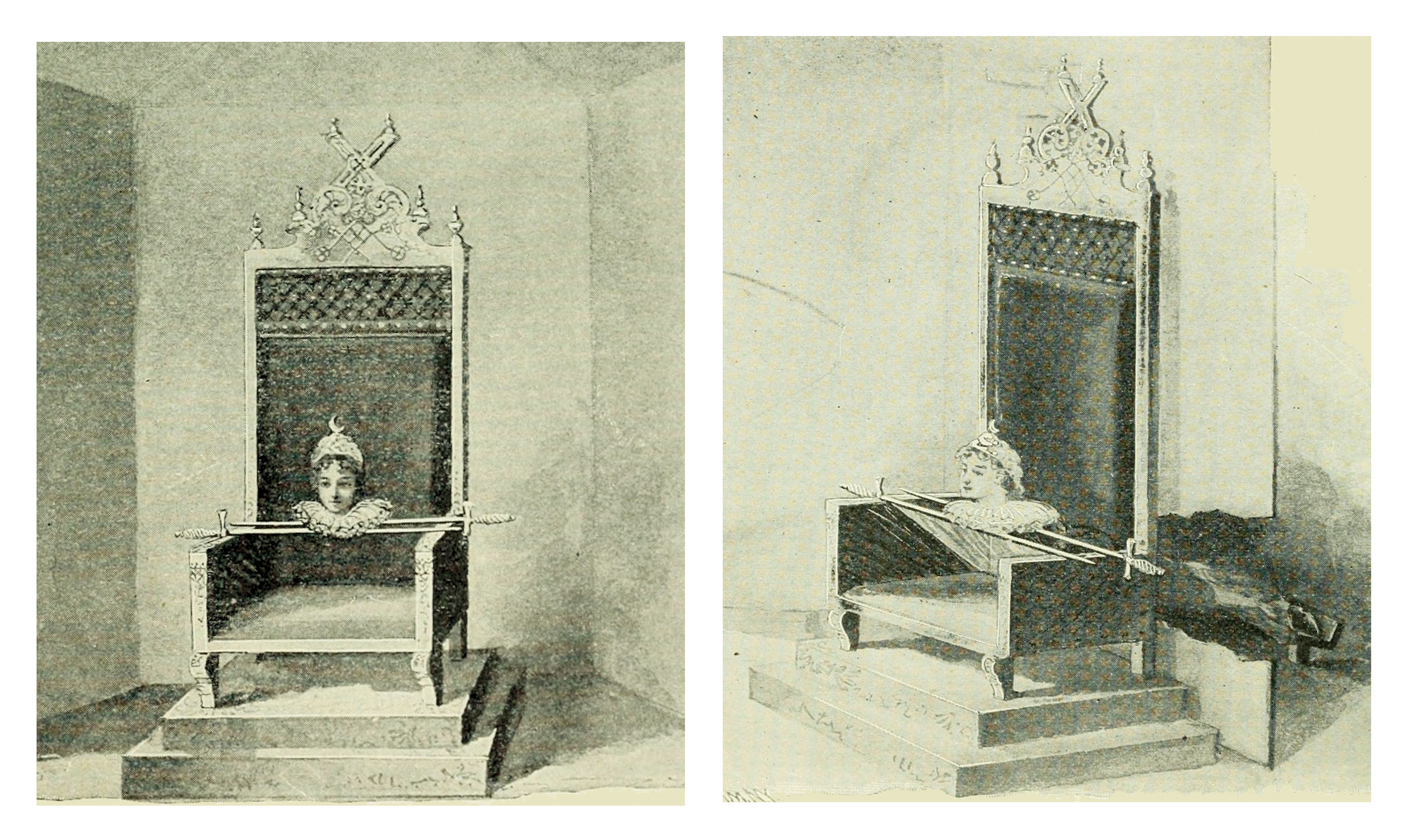
"The Beheaded Princess", front and side view. (Note: The chair used by Nevil Maskelyne for this trick is preserved at the International Museum and Library of the Conjuring Arts in Las Vegas.)

This mirror effect is not the only one possible. A development of the Sphinx illusion is known as "La Princesse décapitée", a variation of which Georges Méliès presented in 1892 under the name "La Source enchantée":

"The spectator is placed in front of a small stage closed by a curtain. When the curtain rises, a woman's head hangs in the middle of the stage. To prove that the head is indeed alive, the barnum presents a candle to blow out, and the candlestick is put back under the head to prove that it is not supported by anything. In reality, the audience is the victim of a complete illusion. A mirror cuts through the empty space along the diagonal of the stage. This mirror is pierced by an opening through which the subject, hidden behind the mirror, sticks his head. The door that the audience thinks they can open under the head, and the candle that appears to be presented straight to the subject, were concealed in the hanger of the small stage and above the curtain. Needless to say, the lighting system is designed so that no light is reflected in the mirror."

The Enchanted Spring (1892)

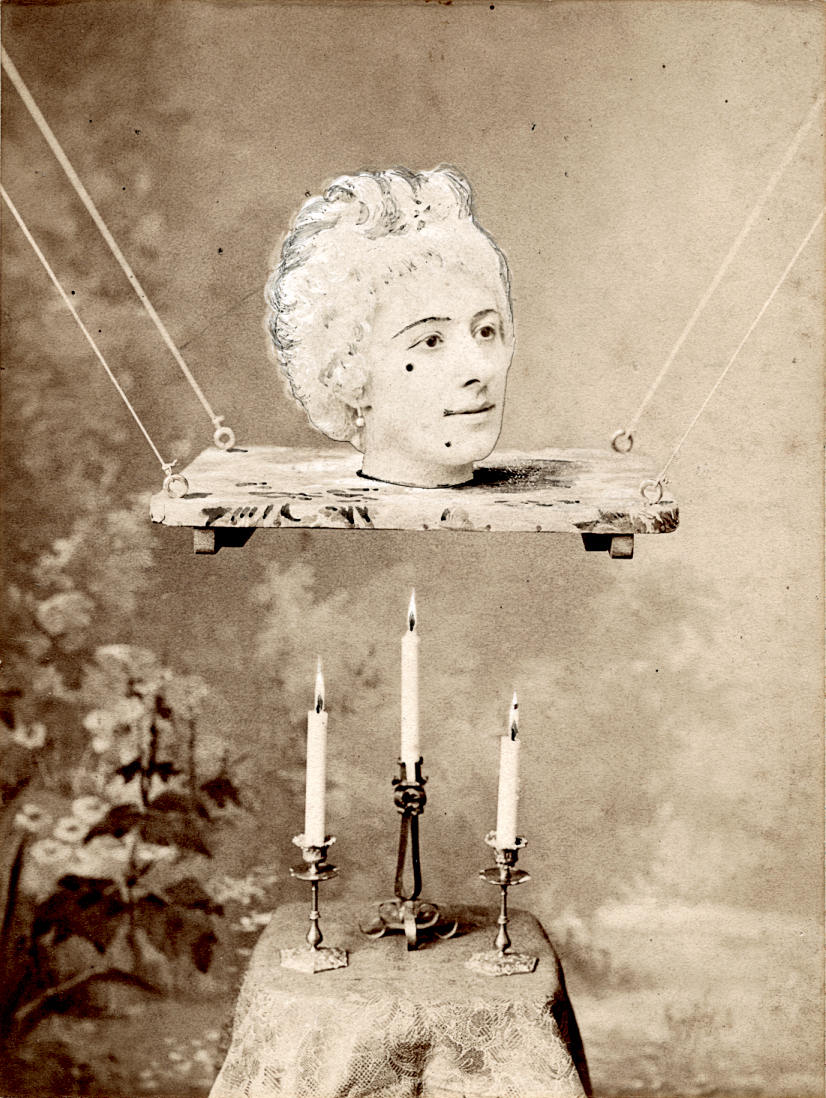
Jehanne d'Alcy.

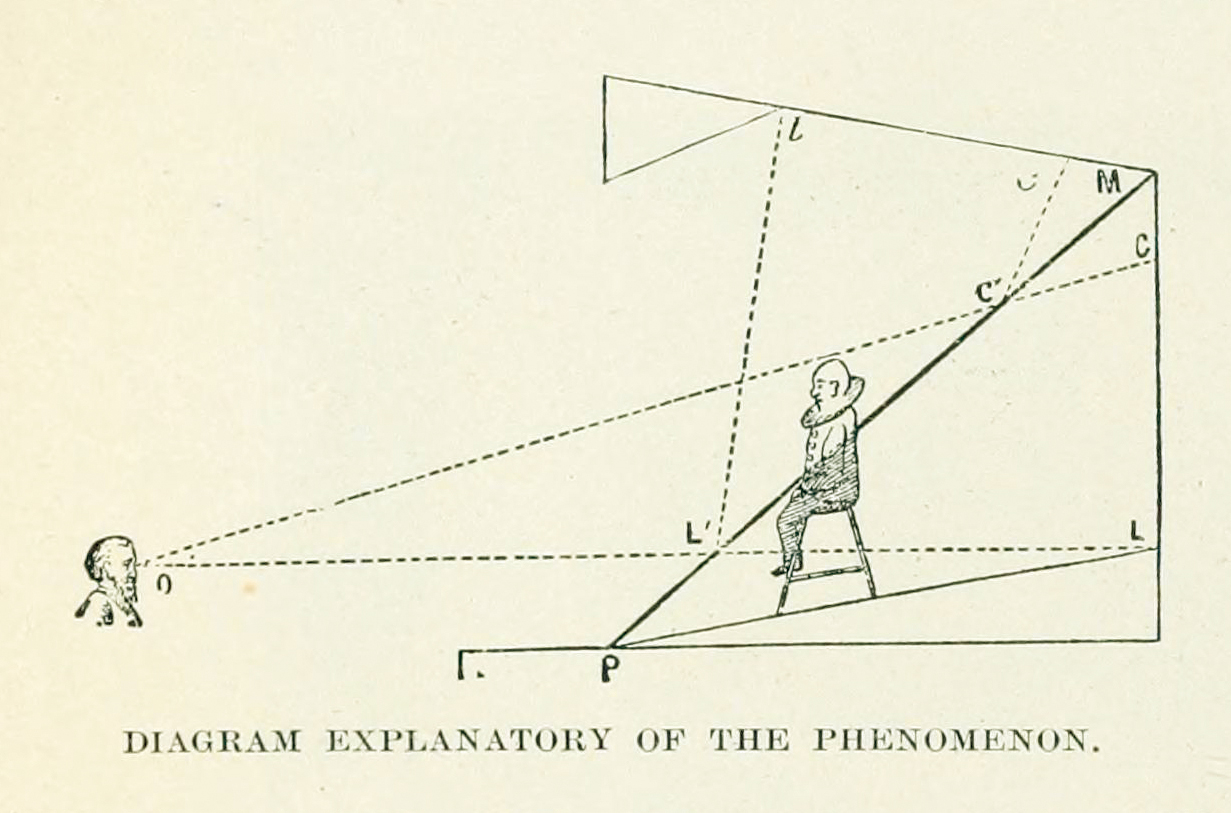
Explanation.

=== Popularized in the U.S. by Roltair ===
Barnum and Bailey circus poster (1898).

These mirror-based illusions were popularized in the U.S. by English illusionist Henry Roltair, regarded at the turn of the 20th century as "the world's greatest illusionist", who, around 1891, transformed his traveling magic show into entresorts, presented notably in a temporary building at the San Francisco International Exposition in 1894 and later by the traveling circus Barnum and Bailey. Michael Leja observes that, as the 1898 poster for this circus shows, spectators at these entresorts were contained behind barriers and forced to observe the illusions head-on: Roltair's illusions were designed for a mass audience in entresorts, they were fixed, continuous installations rather than performances, and they were not characterized by the skill of a prestidigitator, they were "spectacular illusions and not the performances of an illusionist". Leja also notes that the success of Roltair's illusions highlights the versatility of the notion of illusionism in the late nineteenth century: it was as much about "realistic deception" as "frank fantasy", with the term illusion marking "fields of experience in which the distinctions between true and false, real and unreal, fact and fantasy were carefully obscured".

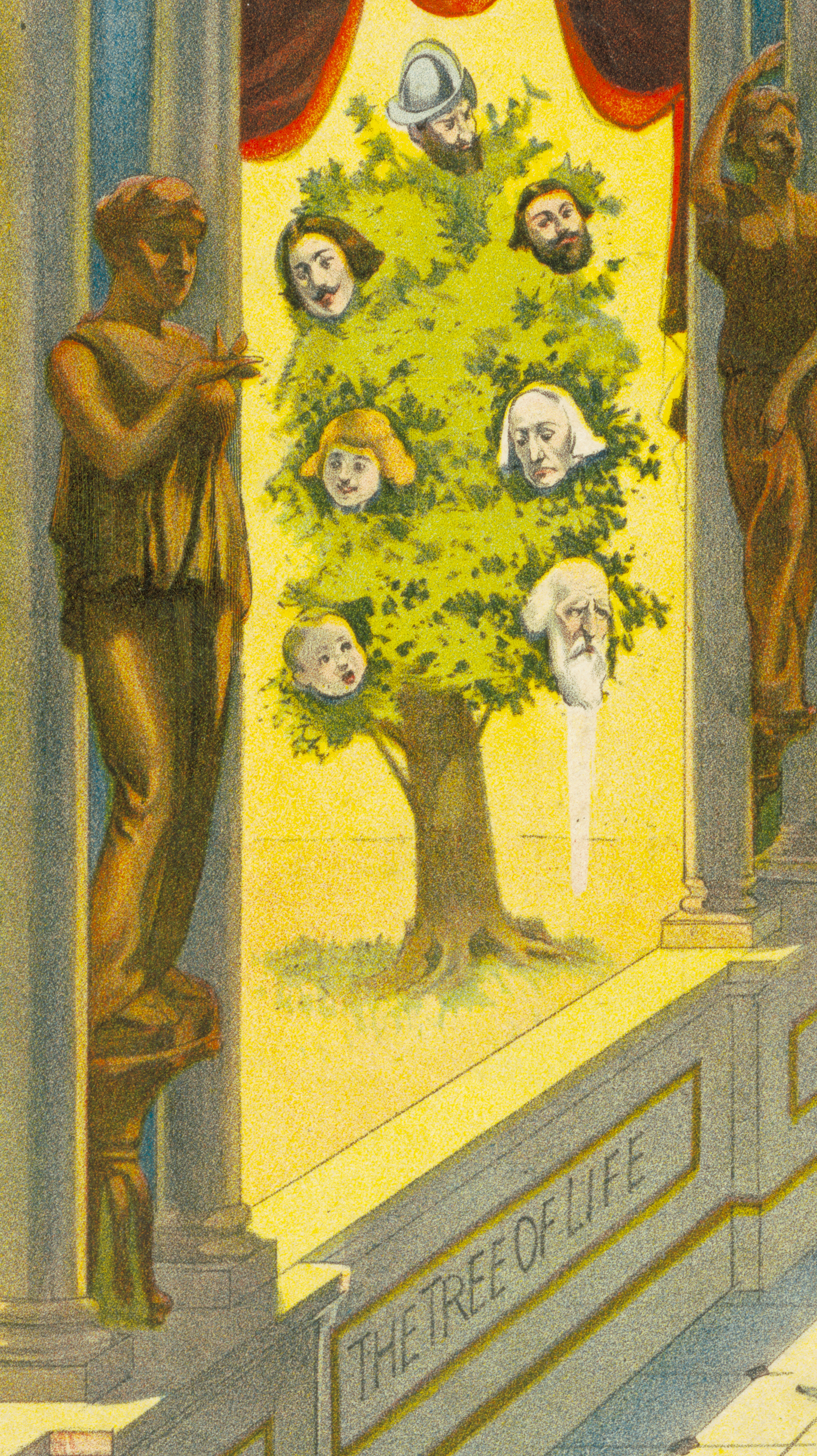
"Tree of Life".

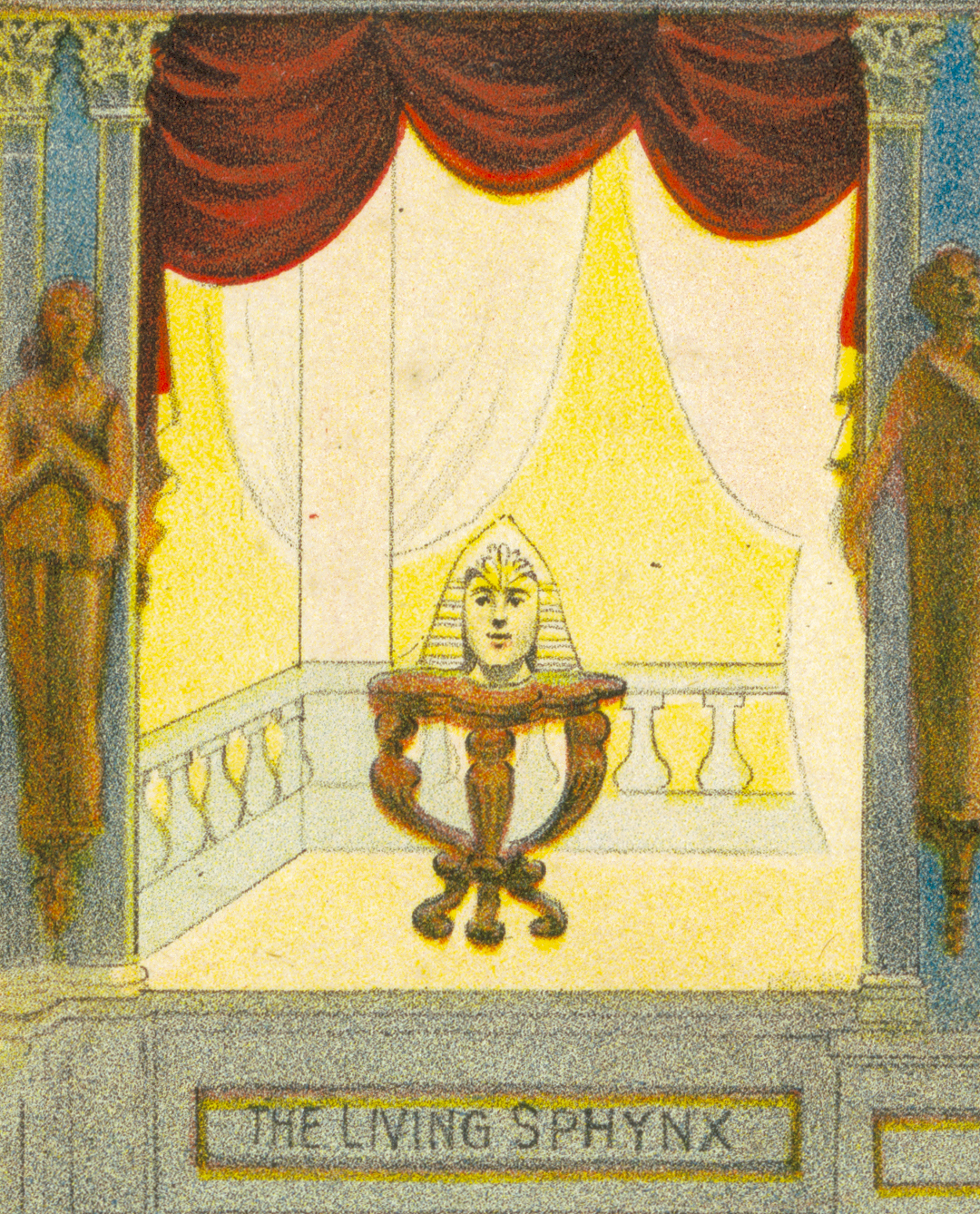
"Living Sphinx".

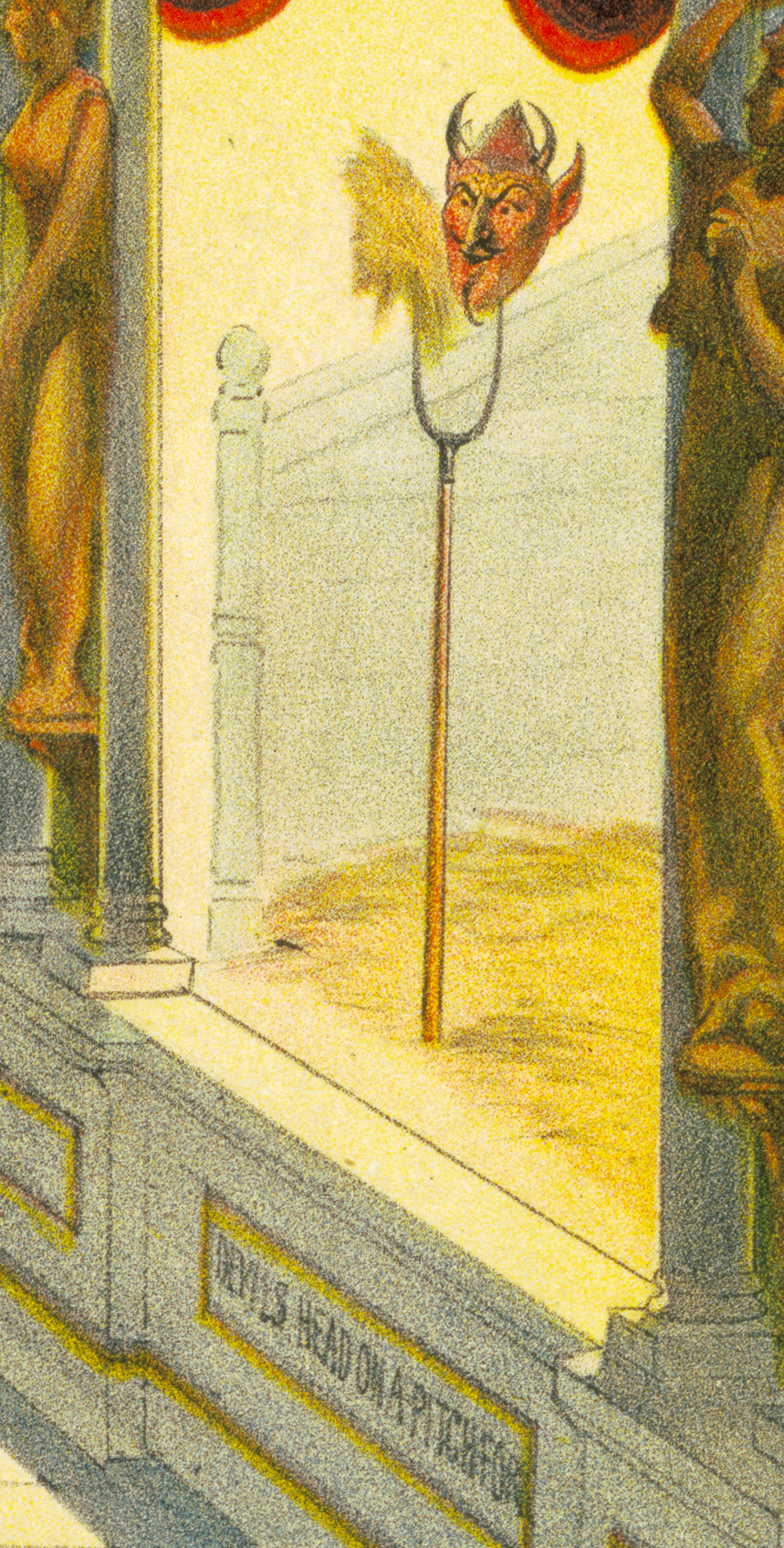
"Devil's Head".

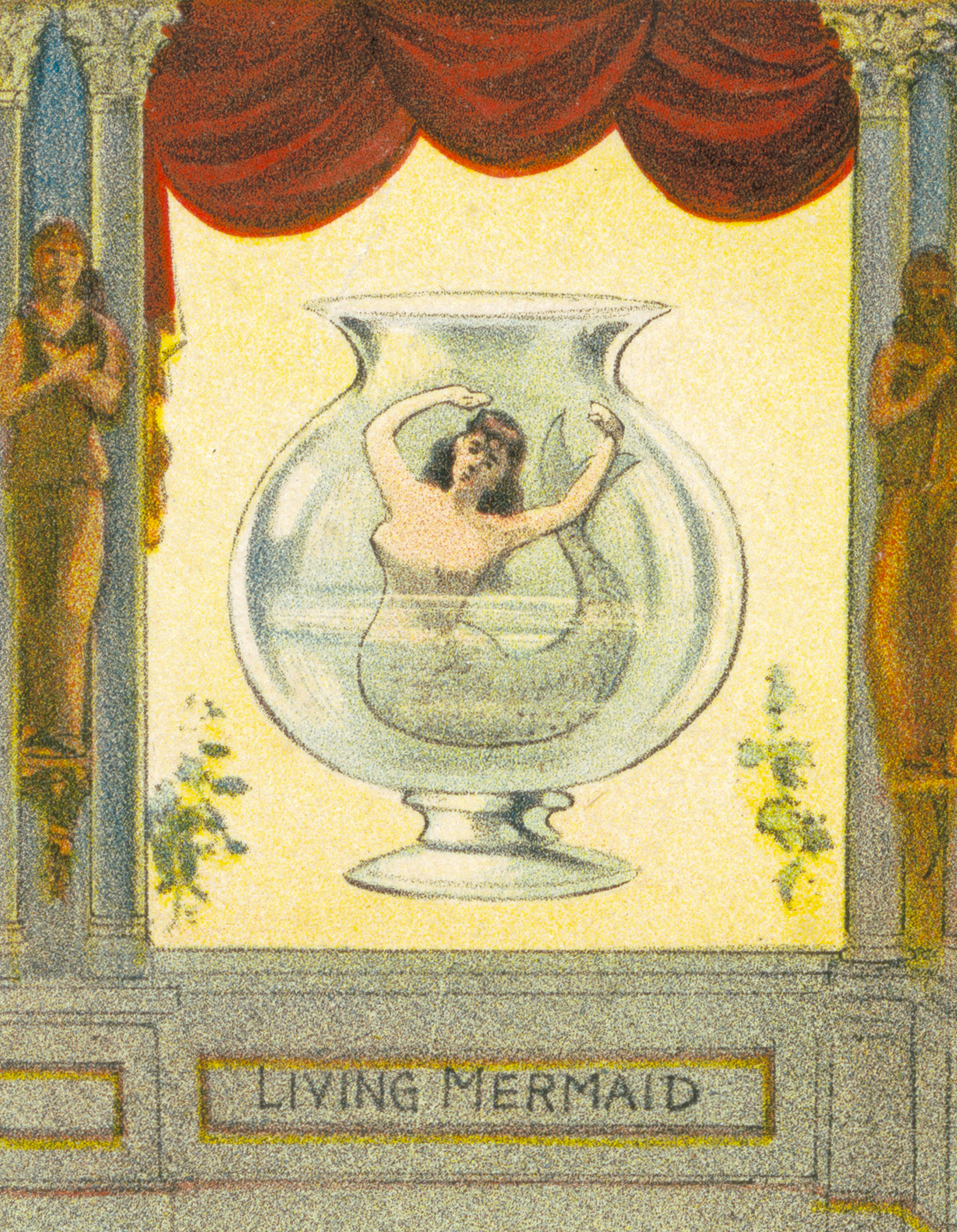
"Living Siren".

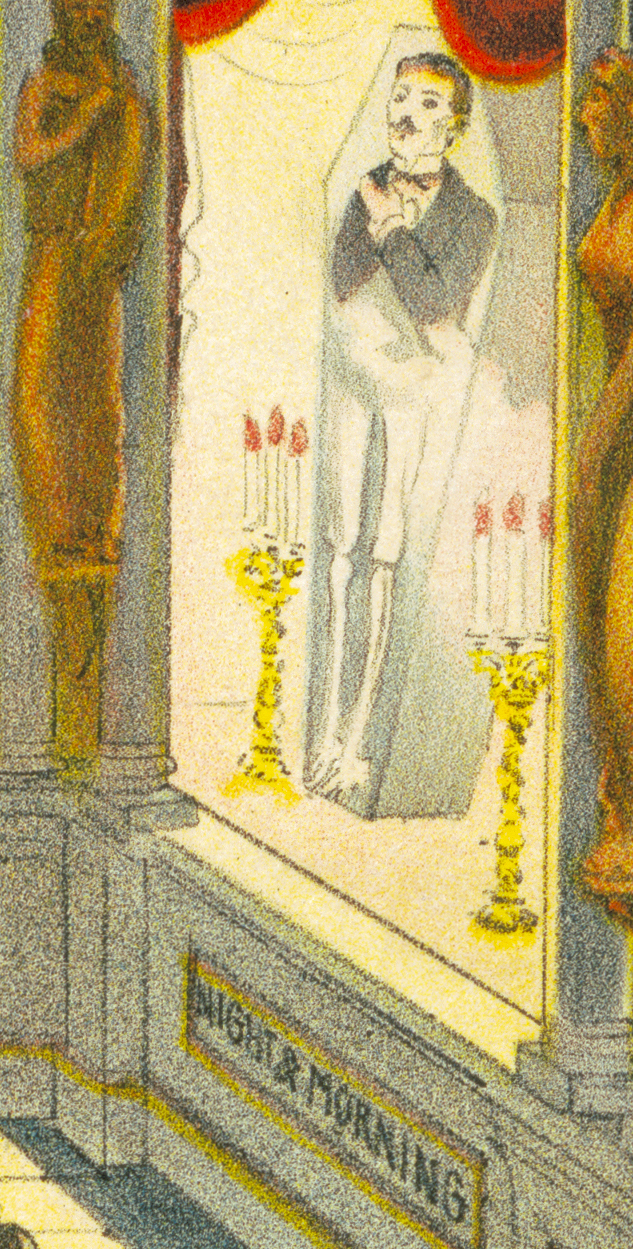
"Night and Morning".

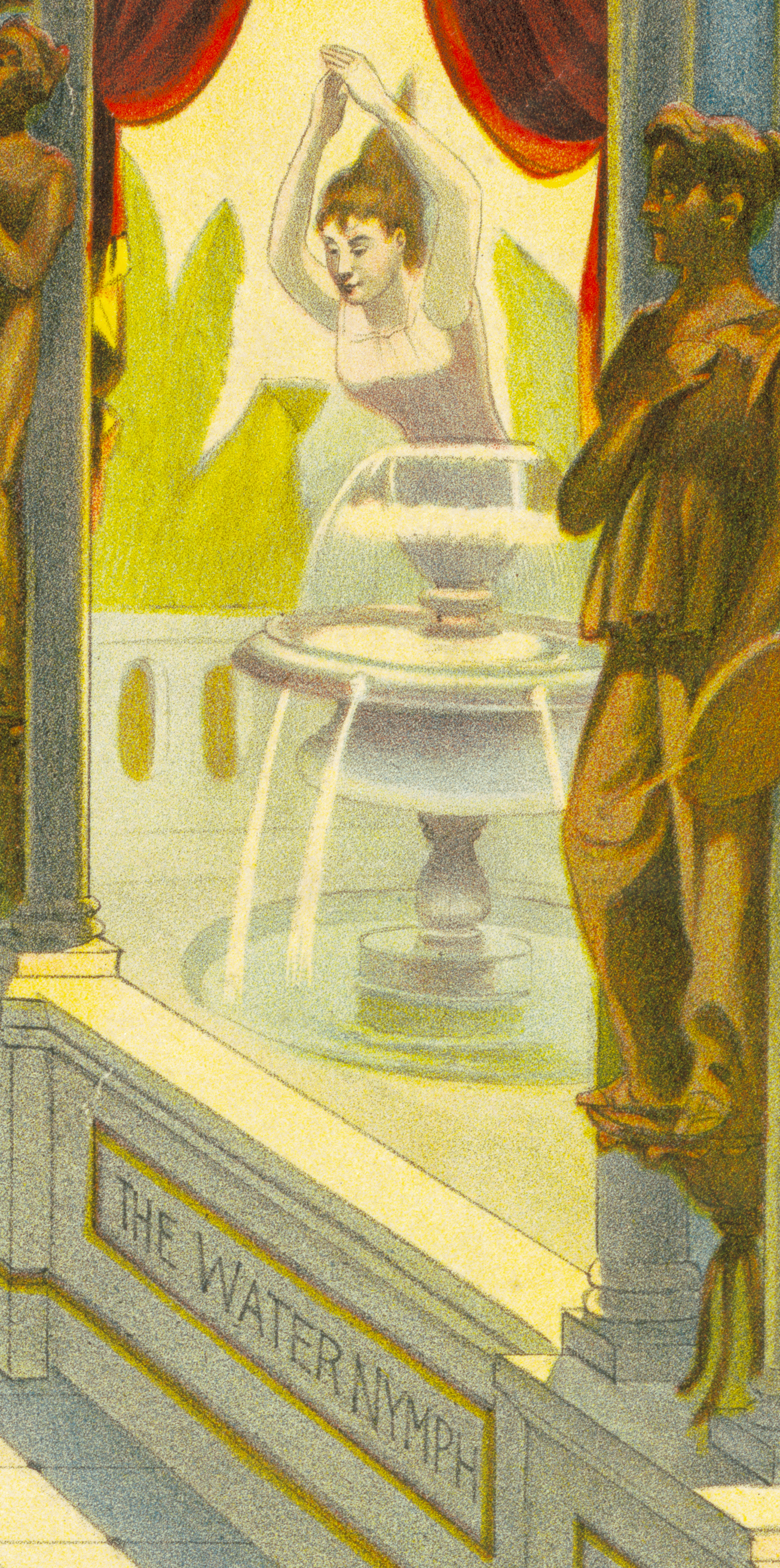
"Water Nymph".

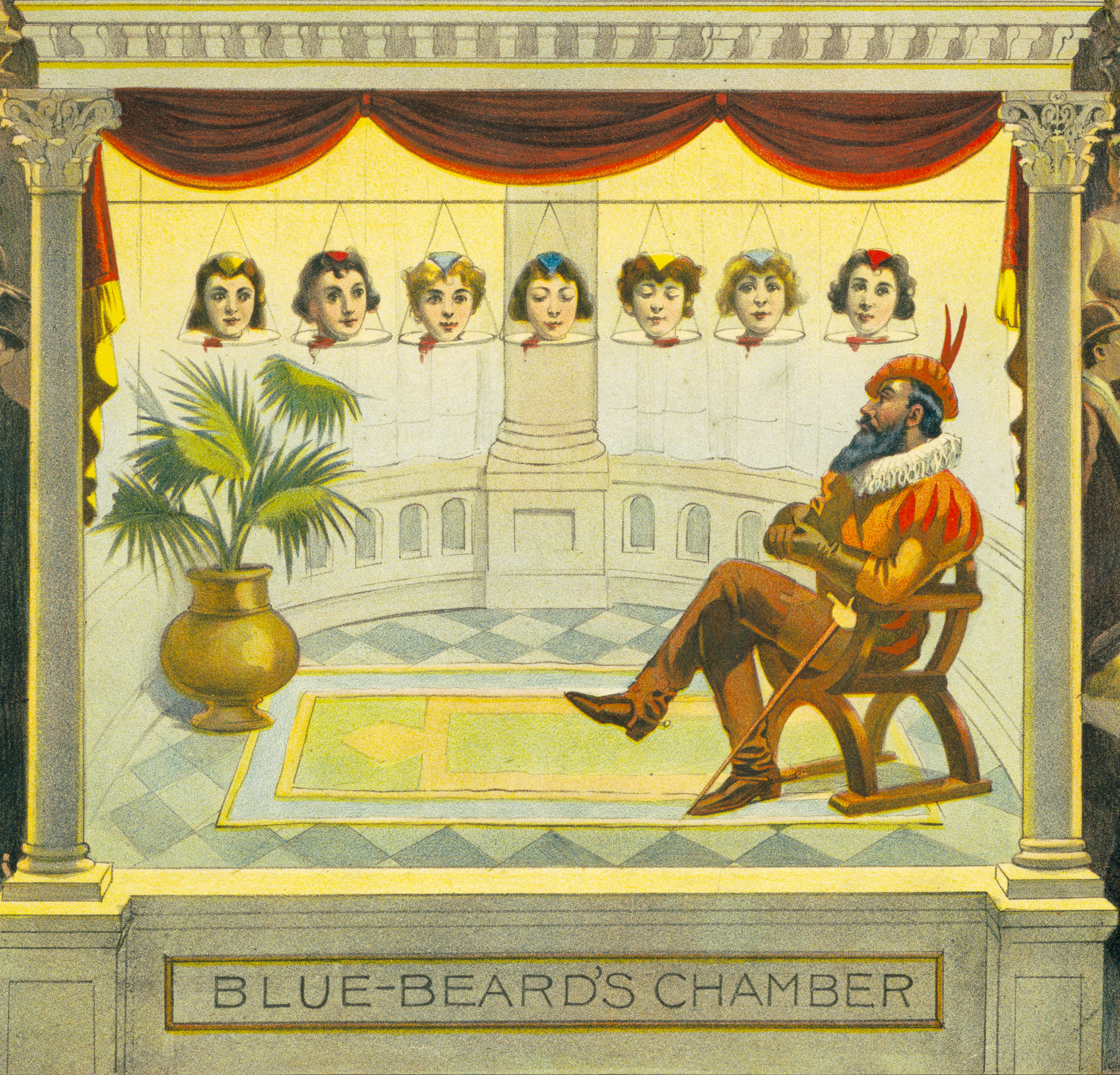
"Bluebeard's bedroom."

Several of the entresorts featured on the poster depict human heads suspended in a strange way: "The Tree of Life" shows seven heads between its branches, of various ages from infancy to old age. In "The Living Sphinx", a head wearing a Pharaoh's headdress, like that of Colonel Stodare, stands on a table. In "The Devil's Head on a Fork", Satan's head rests on one of two prongs. "The Living Mermaid" evokes the famous Fiji Mermaid, showing a woman's bust attached to that of a fish in a jar. "Nuit et Matin" shows a man's trunk emerging from the lower part of a skeleton. "La Nymphe d'eau" shows a woman's bust emerging from a fountain. Finally, located in the center of the room, "Bluebeard's Room", shows Bluebeard seated, facing seven severed and bloody female heads.

Roltair's illusions in 1903.

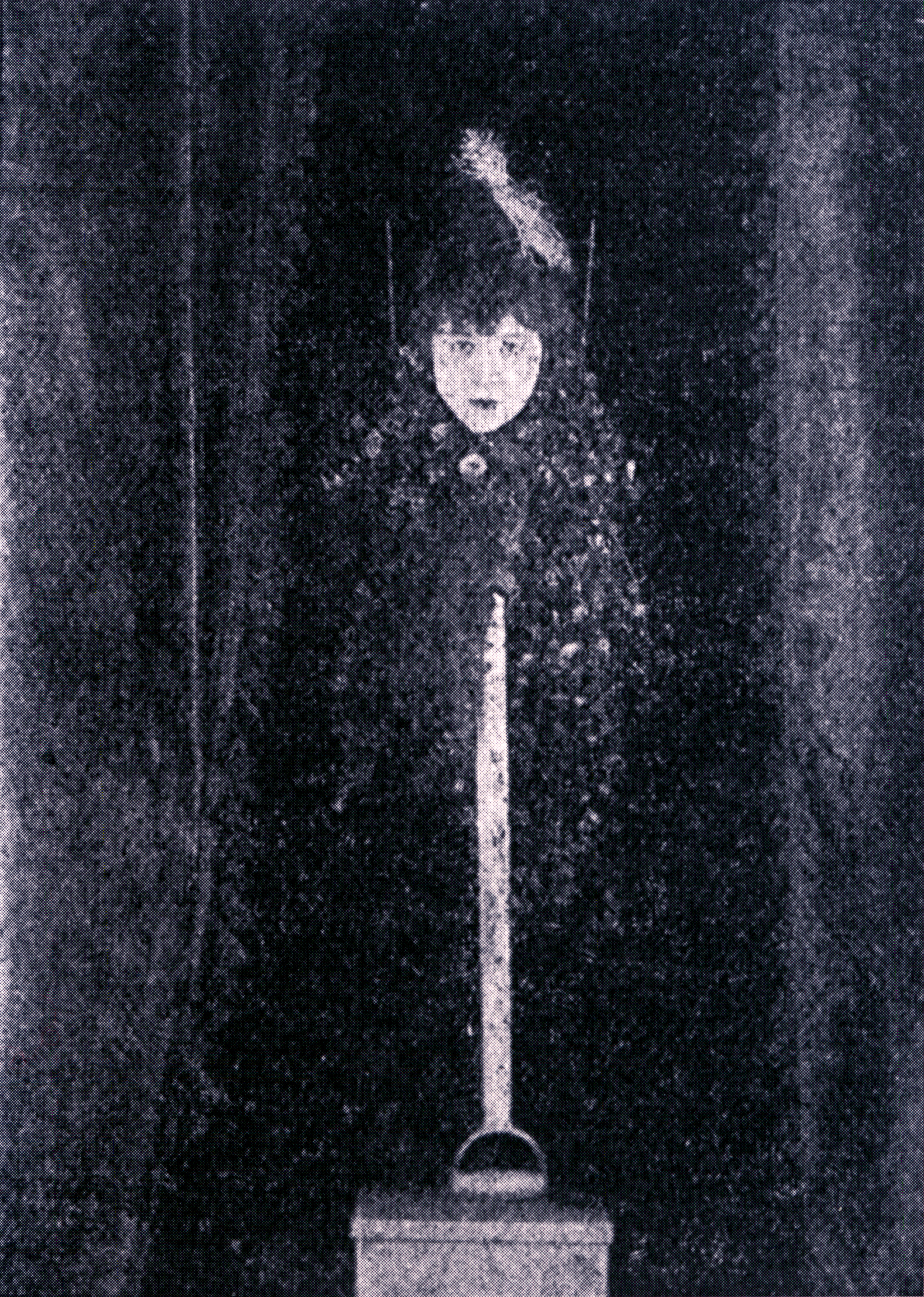
"Satan's Dream".

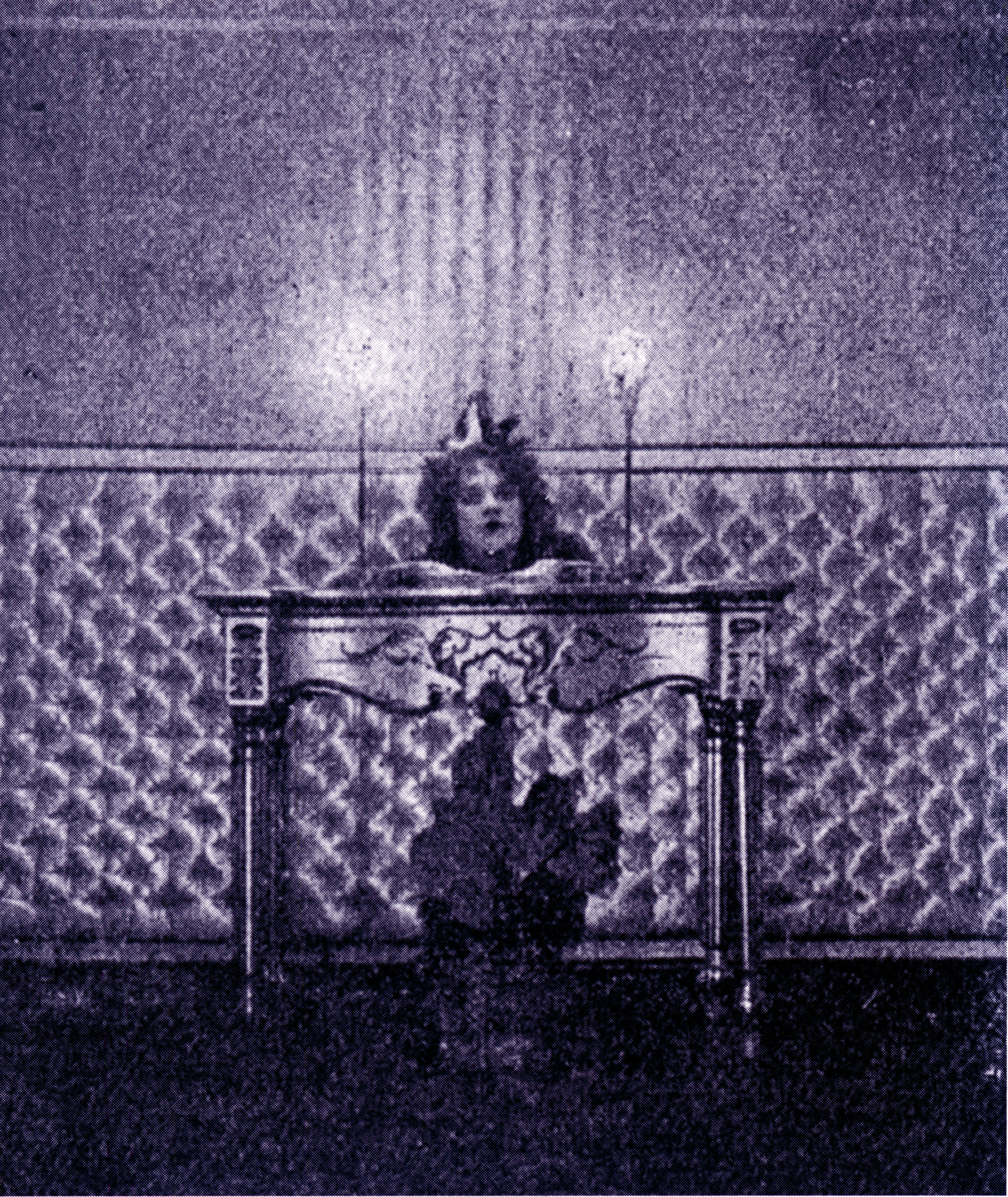
"Madness".

== Vanishing Lady ==
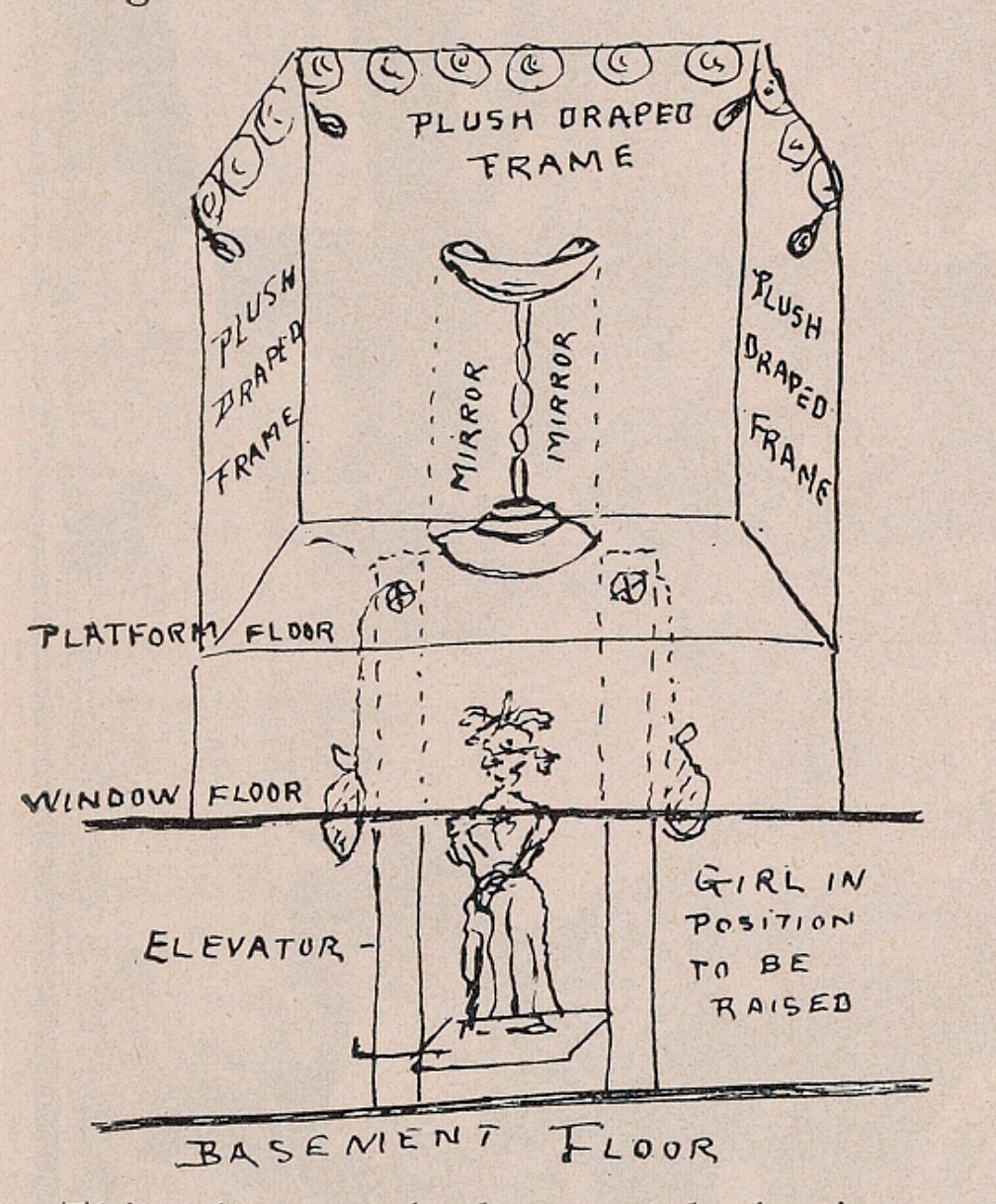
Diagram of the Vanishing Lady by Baum.

As striking as the window illusion described in the section above is, it is nonetheless, according to Baum, surpassed by that of the Vanishing Lady, described by Stuart Culver as a "drama of desire captivating passers-by". According to Baum, it constitutes an "amplification" of the illusion previously described. André Gaudreault, who uses the term "attraction" to characterize early cinema, recalls that as early as 1835, this term was used to designate what "attracts and fascinates the public", before more specifically denoting fairground entertainment, in particular merry-go-rounds. He identifies certain "attractional modalities" that characterize optical attractions, and which were all aspects of this amplification: rotation, repetition and circularity.

Baum gives a rather unclear description of the device, accompanied by a diagram (opposite, left):

"It occupies only a small space in the center of the showcase, showing only the bust and head of a pretty young woman, supported by a slender pedestal topped by a large bowl. Below the waist, the young woman is not visible; at the same time, you can see all around the pedestal, which is supported by two large sandbags. When the young woman rises, a bolt wedges the beam, to prevent the platform from flying off."

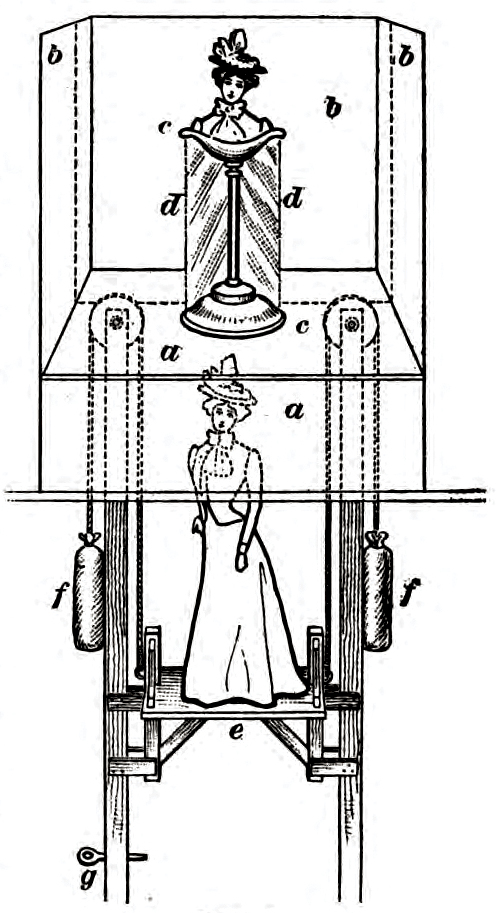
Installation diagram: A platform (a) is surrounded by three panels (b). At its center is a pedestal (c) surrounded by two mirrors (d). The elevator (e) moves and stops thanks to counterweights (f) and a cleat (g).

However consistent it may be with Baum's theses, the Vanishing Lady is not his invention. In an article published in November 1898 in Baum's magazine, The Show Window, Charles Morton claimed authorship. Since 1887, Morton had been head window dresser at Weinstock's department store in Sacramento, and was a regular contributor to Baum's magazine, as well as being president of the American Association of Window Dressers. Morton's work included a sensational animation for the central window of the Sacramento store in 1891. In 1891, for example, he designed a sensational animation for the Sacramento store's central window: the floor would suddenly open and a huge rose would emerge; the petals would slowly spread and a little girl, dressed as a fairy and holding a magic wand in her hand, would emerge and flutter around, trying on hats and including products in her little show, then after about twenty minutes she would re-enter the rose, which would sink back down into the floor.

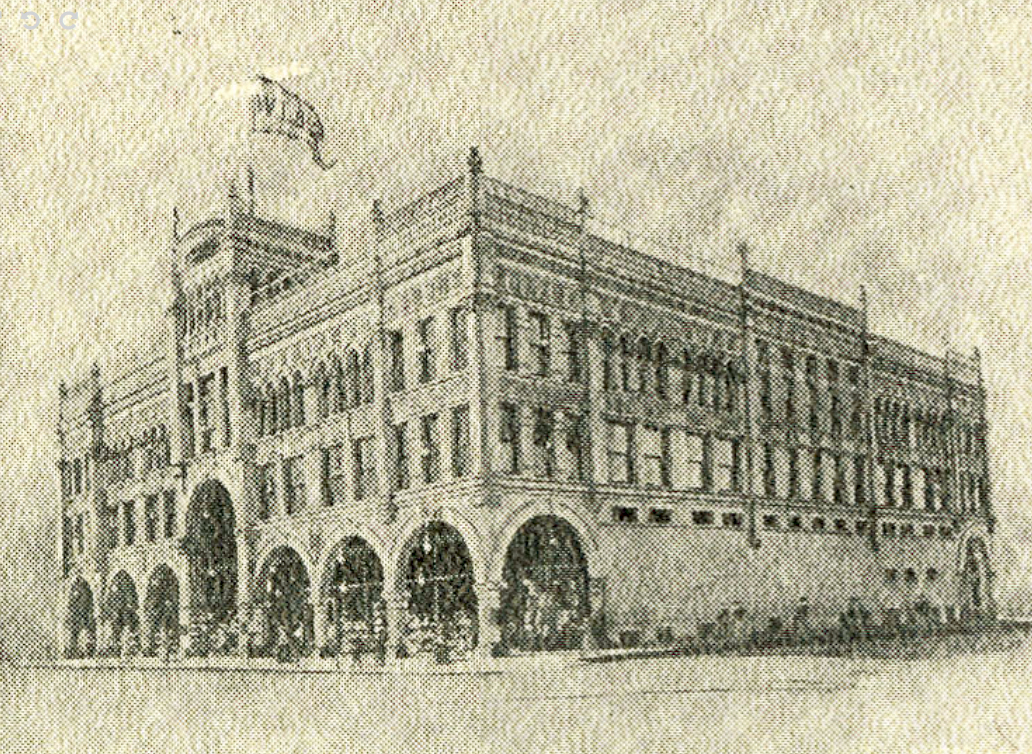
Weinstock's department store in Sacramento before it burned down in 1903.

In his 1898 article, Morton explains how the Vanishing Lady illusion works:

"At short intervals, the young woman would disappear into the pedestal (or so it seemed) and then reappear with a new hat, shirt and gloves, and so on. This went on and on, with a new hat every ten minutes, and so on. A [76 cm] platform is built into the showcase. It is surrounded by three [213 cm] panels, draped with green plush [...] Two mirrors are arranged according to the diagram opposite, right. (Note: Morton's diagram is the same as Baum's. The diagram on the right is taken from a book published in 1903.) They reflect the side panels, giving the impression of seeing all around. A trapdoor in the floor allows the woman to disappear by means of a rudimentary elevator, which takes her to the basement where she changes her hat, tie, etc., only to reappear [...] This showcase was a great success. On the second day, we had to put an iron railing in front of the window, lest it be broken by the crowd. The young lady was very pretty, all the hats were fitting and the outfit changes went on all day. We sold a lot of hats this way.

The Vanishing Lady earned Charles Morton a "diamond medal" and a $500 prize from the American Association of Window Displays in 1899. Interviewed in 1921 by a trade periodical, he nevertheless relativized the success of his 1898 creation, seeing it in retrospect as representative of a period when window displays were ingenious and attractive, but of dubious commercial effectiveness.

Vanishing Lady window and morning crowd admiring it (1898).

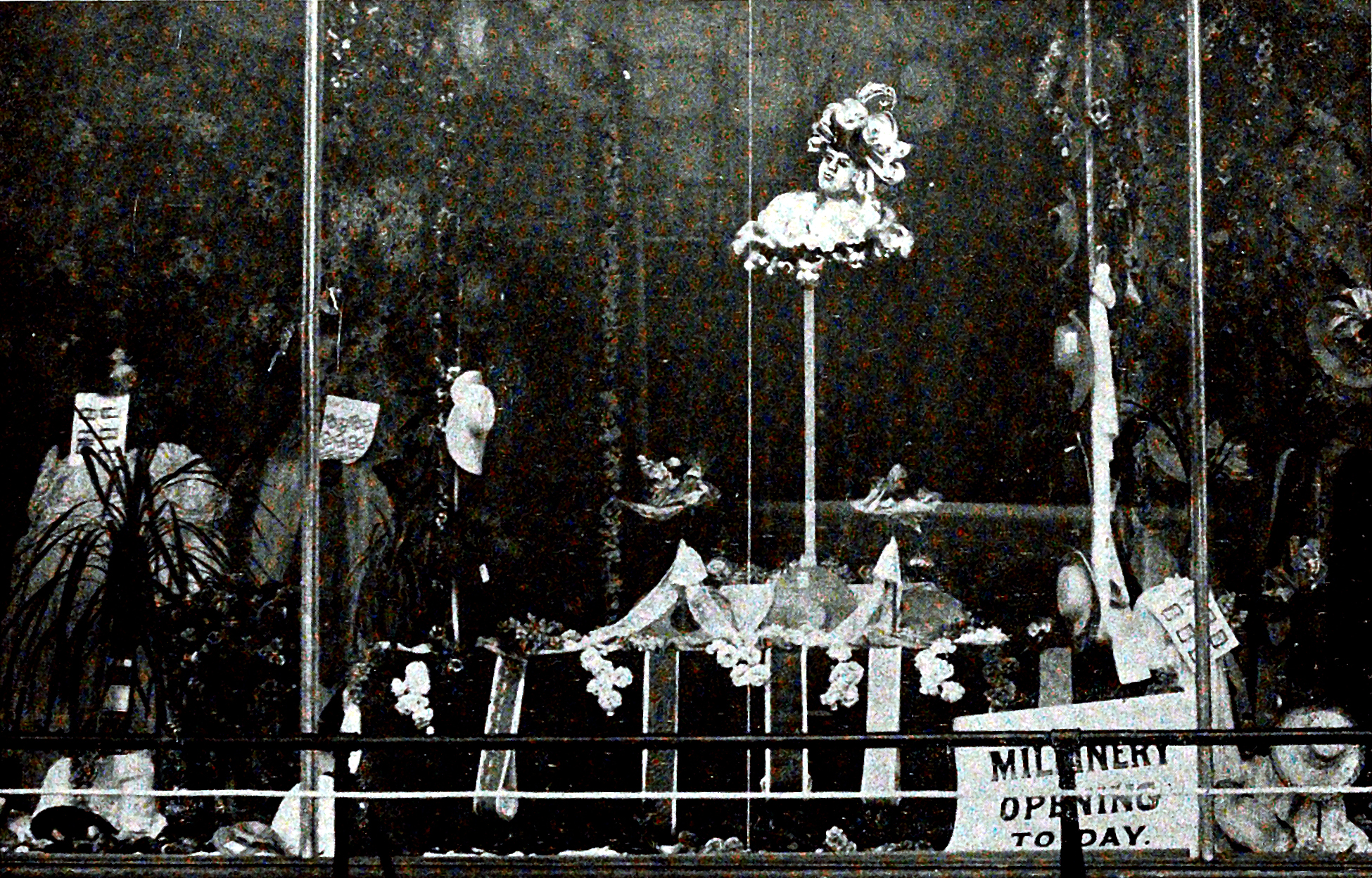

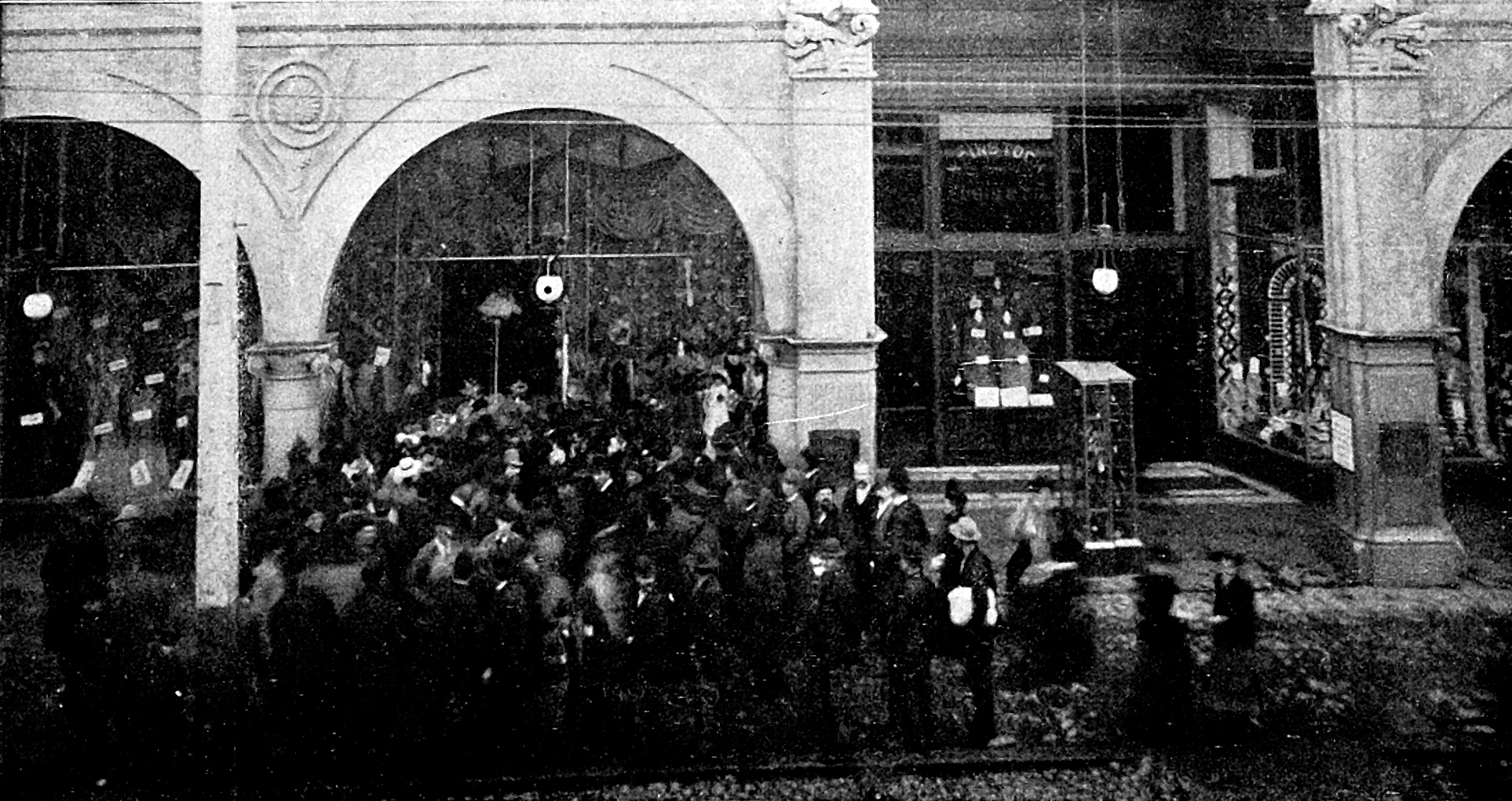

== Reference to a famous illusion ==
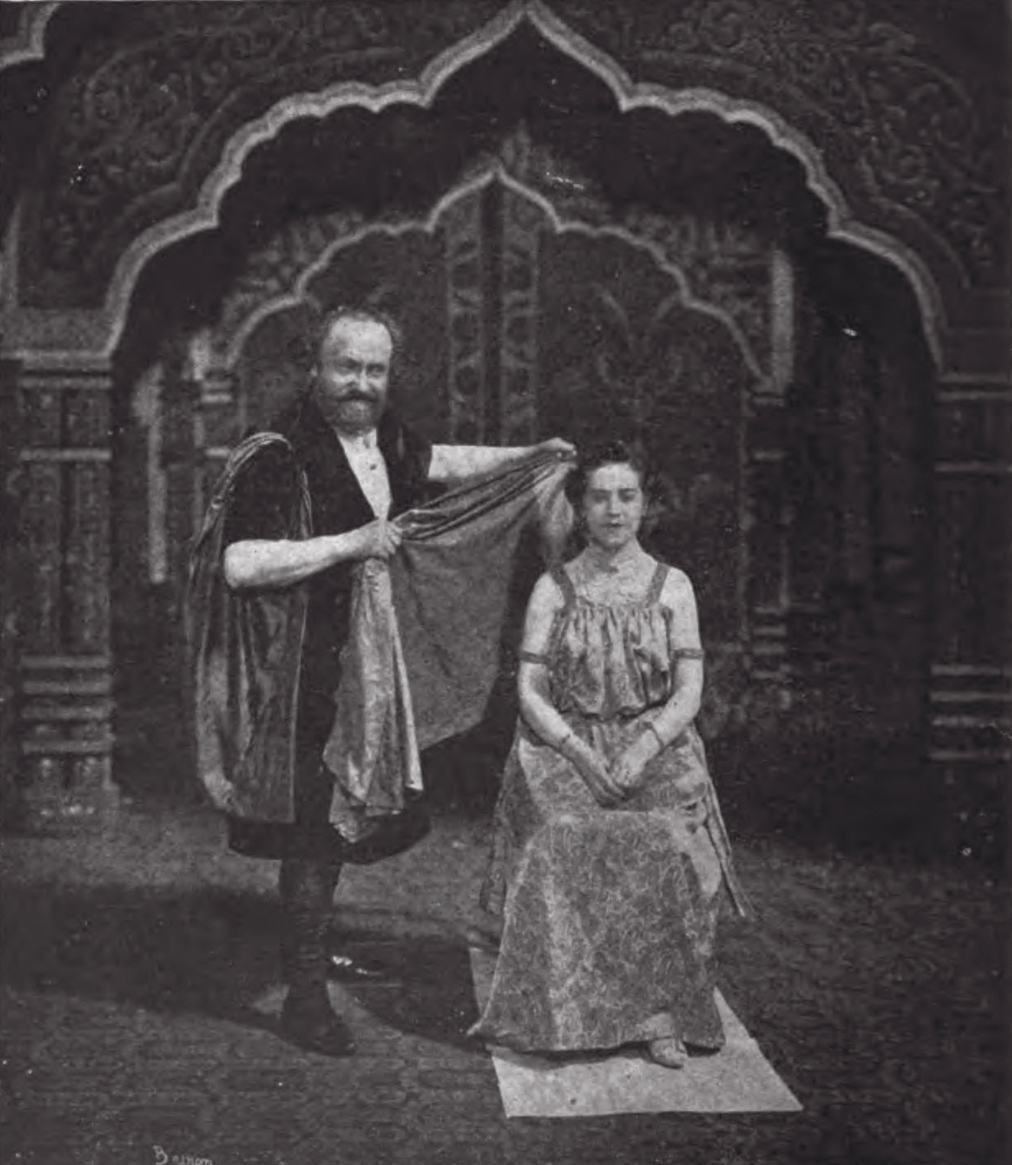
Buatier de Kolta's La Femme enlevée (The Vanishing Lady) was performed in 1902 at the Eden Museum in New York with his wife, Alice Mumford.

As Amy Reading points out, the name given to this window illusion refers to one of the most famous tricks in stage magic, La Femme enlevée, known in english as The Vanishing Lady, created in 1886 in Paris by the French magician Buatier de Kolta, then taken up in London by Charles Bertram and presented worldwide by other magicians, such as Dr. Lynn in Melbourne and Adolph Seeman in Chicago. In 1890, the English lecturer Angelo John Lewis, known by his pen name "Professor Hoffmann", gave a full description in More Magic, noting that the very success of this "capital" trick had led to its "ruin", with most spectators now familiar with the trick.

=== Description of Buatier's illusion ===
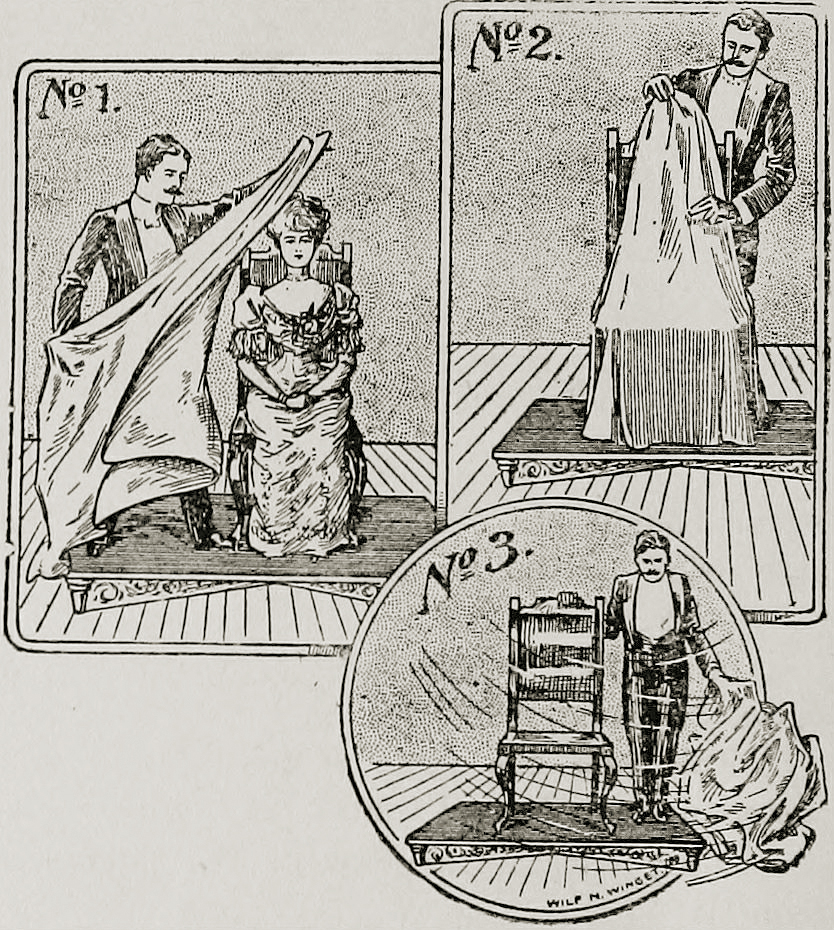
Diagram of Buatier's lathe.

When the illusion was first presented in Paris in April 1886, Émile Blavet described it as follows in Le Figaro:

"He spreads a large-format newspaper, the Times, on the stage floor. On this newspaper he places a chair of some kind; on this chair he seats a young woman, his own; he covers the subject with a light, almost transparent silk, which he drapes tightly over her, molding her from head to toe. The operation lasts scarcely a few seconds, after which t he operator, in the midst of a gloomy silence, under the glare of all eyes anxiously focused on the narrow space where he is maneuvering, takes hold of the fabric between his two forefingers and two thumbs, blows on it with force, violently removes it and... neither seen nor known. No more woman! The newspaper has not moved a line, and on its four feet, whose footprints are unchanging, the chair alone appears, empty of its elegant burden!"

=== A new illusion ===
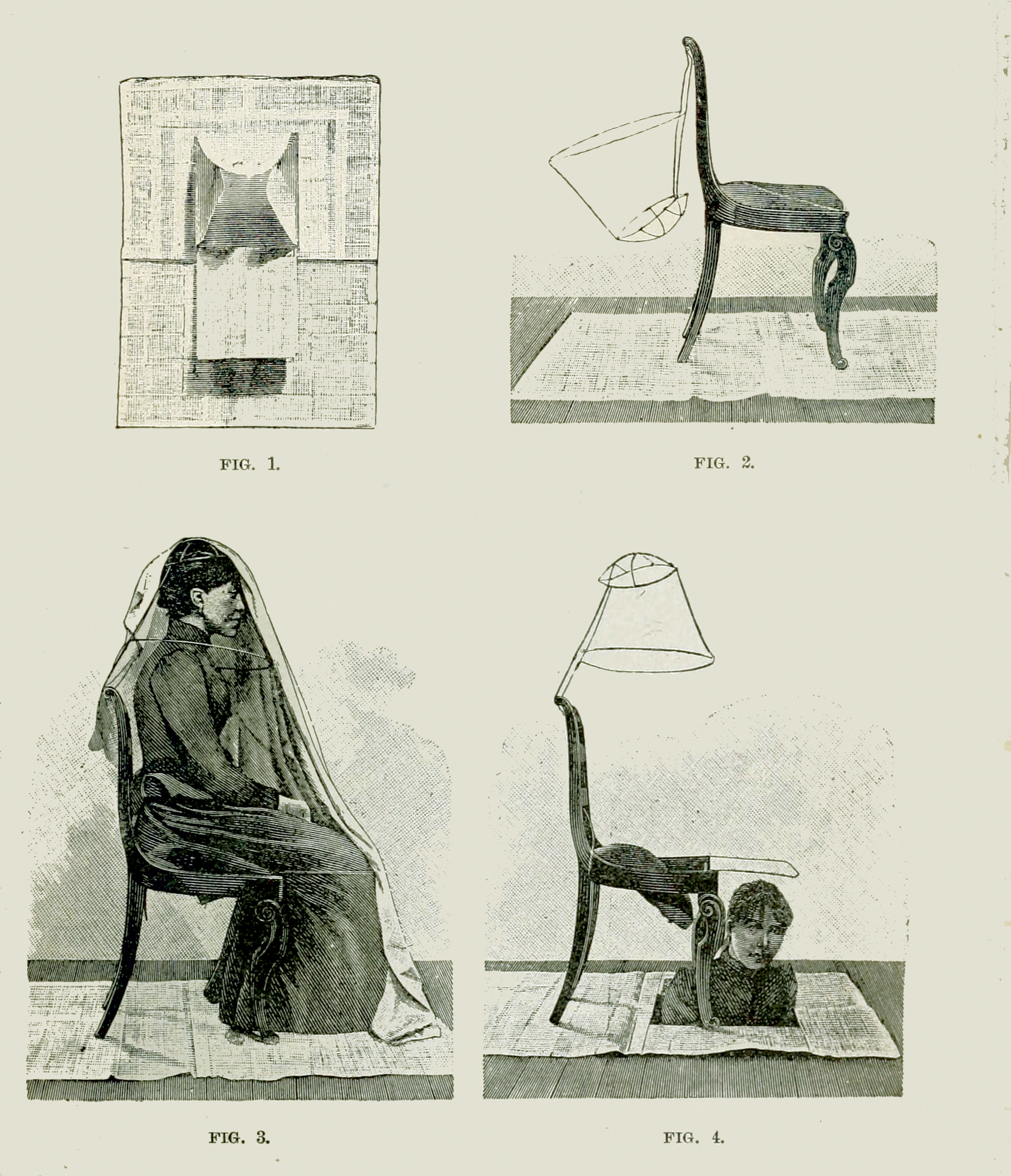
The printed characters of the rubber newspaper conceal a slot (1). The seat of the chair swivels forward and its back conceals a wire structure (2). The wire structure pivots and retains the shape of the head under the veil (3). The woman slides into a trapdoor in the floor through the opening in the newspaper (4).

Although Buatier's trick is not based on an optical illusion, it is nonetheless based on a new approach, illusionism. Blavet notes that Buatier calls himself an "illusionist" and that he "does not boast of magic: his aim is to give the illusion of it, not by prodigies of dexterity, but by scientific means". Raoul Toché in Le Gaulois also notes this neologism "ingenious", borrowed from English by Buatier, to whom an American nationality is attributed:

"This epithet is quite a program. The man who inaugurated it has no pretension of being a sorcerer: he's just deluding us."

Katharina Rein observes that La Femme enlevée remains to this day "one of the most iconic stage illusions". In her view, this celebrity is due to the fact that, like the derivative illusion produced in 1896 by Méliès (see below), "the technology or machinery that produces the effect remains imperceptible to the audience". She considers this "disappearance of the means" to be a fundamental characteristic of modern magic, in the "highly mechanized" form it took from the second half of the 19th century onwards. She identifies two fundamental characteristics illustrated by this trick:

- Simulation: giving an existence to things that don't exist, or a presence to things that were absent. The woman appears to be still present under the veil, whereas she has already disappeared into the trapdoor, and only the wire simulates her presence.
- Disguise: the fact that the trick's accessories were designed not as hiding places but as camouflage, as innocuous-looking objects that no-one would associate with cheating. Such is the case with the chair and newspaper, which appear to be normal objects.

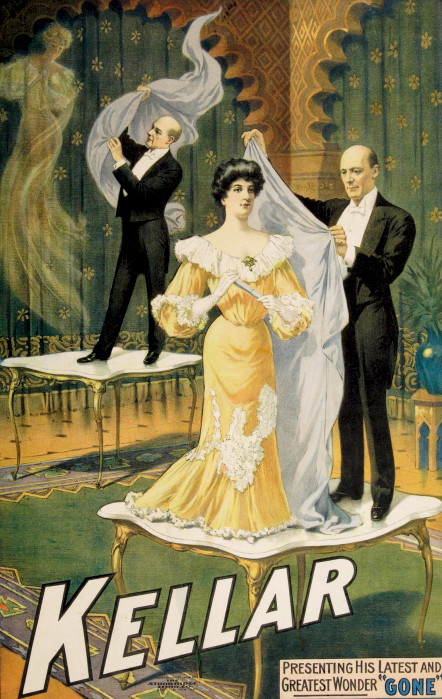
Harry Kellar is considered the most likely model for the Wizard of Oz.

Katharina Rein emphasized the special status of the newspaper under the chair, which not only camouflaged the trapdoor, but also served to "demonstrate" that there is no trapdoor, even though spectators aware of the existence of this means, assume there is one, thus playing the role of a self-referential "epistemological loop", "showing that the illusionist is aware that the spectators were aware that they were witnessing an illusion", while at the same time proving himself capable of surprising them. In this, she applied the analysis of German philosopher Sybille Krämer, according to whom media (in this case, the illusionist's stage) "function like panes of glass: the more transparent they remain, the more discreetly they remain under the threshold of our consciousness, the better they do their job".

=== Disappearance and theater noir ===
In response to the numerous plagiarisms of La Femme enlevée, Buatier filed a patent in France in November 1886 fora new way of appearing and disappearing spectres or other real beings, based on the use of a uniform, dark drapery on all stage walls, floor and ceiling. This patent was used in December of the same year in a show given in London entitled Modern Black Magic, to which several authors trace the modern practice of "black theater", (Note: The World Encyclopedia of Puppetry defines black theater as "a theatrical technique for making certain characters or objects appear [...] while concealing others".) based on the two techniques of background masking (an object becomes invisible because it is hidden behind a mask of the same material as the background) and background blending (the mask is invisible because it is camouflaged).

However, modern use of the process was attested to a few years before Buatier by the Australian illusionist Hugh Washington Simmons, calling himself Dr Lynn, who presented his Thauma trick at the Folies Bergère in 1884:

"Against the matte black background of the stage, we could see the bust of a living woman, resting on an escarpolette held in place by very shiny metal chains [...] [The trick employed] is quite simple. The woman, whose bust rested on a mannequin simulating the part of the body that extends from the chest to the waist, was lying almost horizontally on a kind of hammock that could follow the oscillations of the escarpolette. But this whole part of her body was hidden by the matte-black draperies that formed the backdrop to the scene, made more obscure by contrast with the shiny chains of the escarpolette. The latter, like the bust, was brightly."

Dr. Lynn's "Thauma".

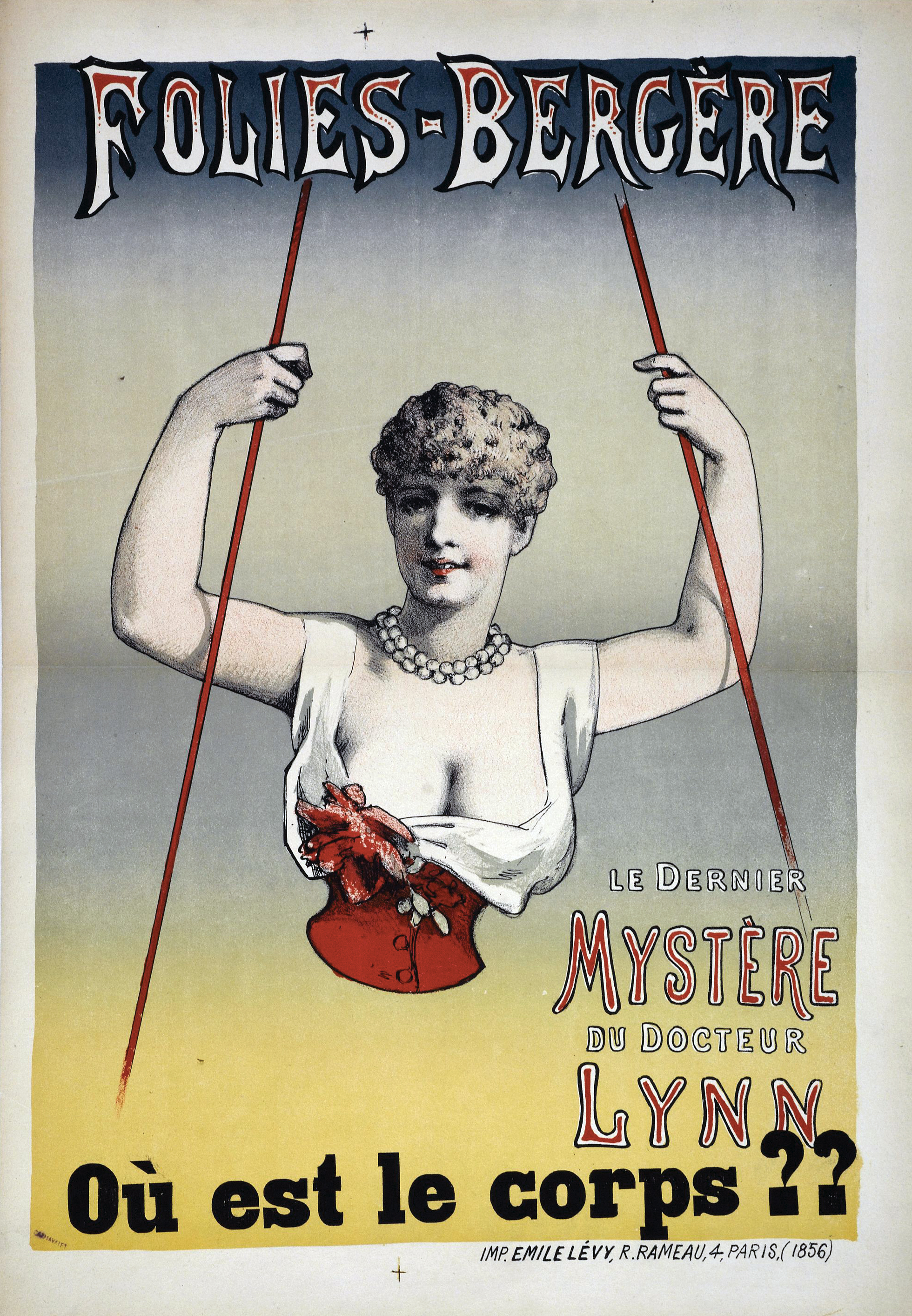
Poster (1885).

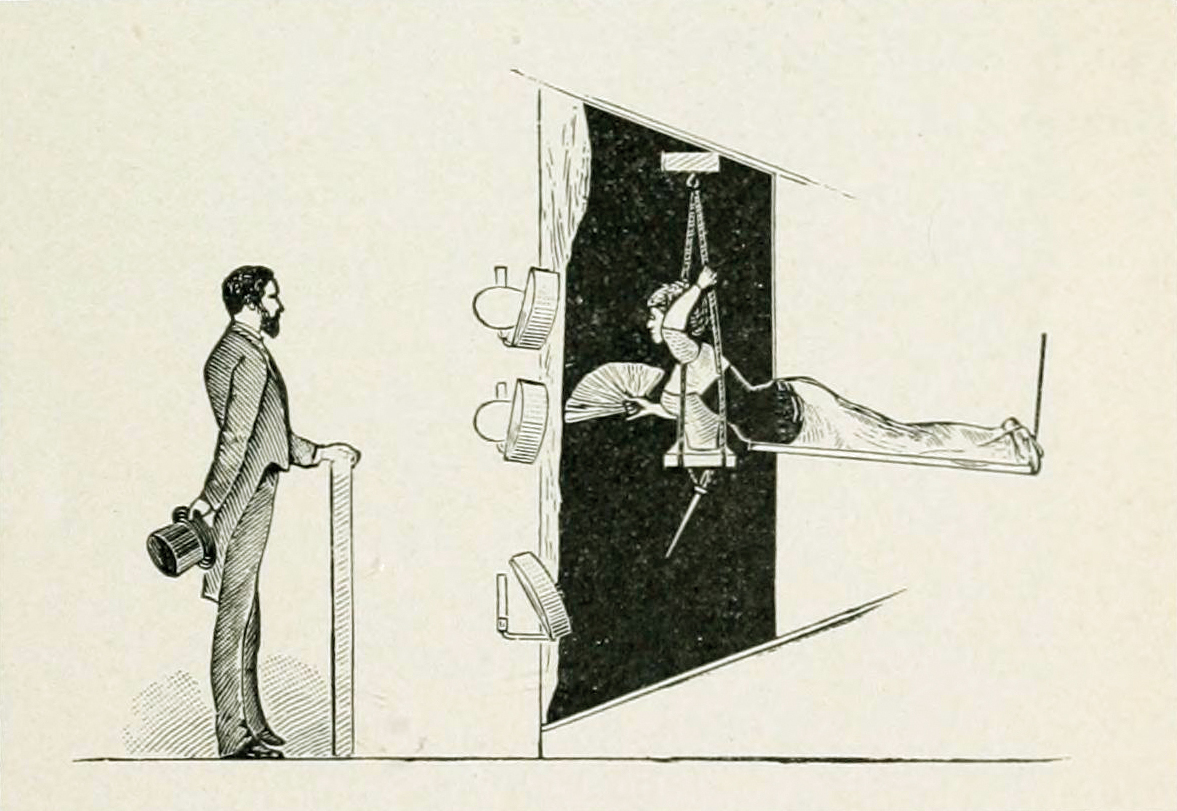
Explanation.

== From windows to screens ==
Buatier's illusion, to which the Vanishing Lady refers, was famously revived by Méliès, who in turn inspired Baum's cinematic creations a few years later.

=== Méliès takes over Buatier ===
The vanishing lady at the Théâtre Robert-Houdin (1896) by Georges Méliès assisted by Jehanne d'Alcy (Note: Jehanne d'Alcy, a very small and supple acrobat, was the subject of numerous escamotages, particularly in an unofficial version of La Femme enlevée presented in July 1886. On the other hand, Charles Bertram, who created the "official" transposition of Buatier's whole in London in 1886, noted, not without pride, that his companion Mlle Patrice - who would later become known as "the beautiful magician" - was "in no way small, a fact which significantly enhanced the effect of her disappearance".)

Ten years after the creation of La Femme enlevée and two years before Morton's showcase, in 1896 Georges Méliès created a film version of the trick, Escamotage d'une dame au théâtre Robert-Houdin. (Note: Buatier and Méliès probably met between 1888 and 1890, the latter writing: "Buatier de Kolta, who had given a few auditions on our stage [at the Théâtre Robert-Houdin], used as he was to the big music-hall stages, did not find sufficient space on ours to show the great illusions that made his triumph".) Frédéric Tabet observes that, while at first glance Méliès' film strip seems to take up Buatier's illusion, to which its title refers, it departs from it both narratively (notably with the skeleton sequence) and technically: not only does Méliès use the substitution trick rather than a trapdoor, but he maintains the shape of the veil for a few seconds before lifting it to reveal the disappearance, emphasizing that the newspaper is a real newspaper and the chair has a real back, thus creating a sense of strangeness for viewers familiar with Buatier's process:

The Vanishing Lady (1898), a particularly popular tape by James Stuart Blackton, with cameraman and illusionist (Note: Before making films, Albert E. Smith and James Stuart Blackton were illusionists, first separately and then in a joint act.) Albert E. Smith as the magician (Note: This film could have been inspired by either of two homonymous films that have since disappeared, Robert W. Paul's 1897 film, starring magician Charles Bertram, who created Buatier's illusion in London in 1886, or the one produced by American Mutoscope, also in 1897, with Paul Gilmore in the same role. In France, Méliès' film was imitated by Alice Guy in Scène d'escamotage in 1898.)

Georges Méliès thus achieves a double movement: a rapprochement of the scene and simultaneously a dissociation, presenting a different fall [from Buatier's]. The continuity is "constructed", masking the new [substitution] trickery with an obvious reference to Buatier's illusion.

For his part, Pierre Jenn emphasizes the seminal character of this film, Méliès's first trick film, noting that Méliès retained the appearances of Buatier's trick not so much to produce filmed theater, nor to respect theatrical convention, but to use the effect of reality provided by this convention to conceal something else: maintaining the spatial frame allows us to believe in temporal continuity, in the fact that the trick is actually performed over an uninterrupted minute, while concealing the existence of trickery by substitution and editing. By drawing the viewer's gaze to the newspaper on the floor, Méliès is no longer trying to conceal the existence of a trapdoor, but rather the traces of gluing between shots, located in the upper part of the screen. As Tom Gunning sums up, Buatier's apparent fidelity to the conventions of illusion is not the sign of a kind of primitive servility, but rather a carefully constructed new illusion designed to conceal the cinematographic process at work.

From Le Magicien by Méliès (1898).

The revival of certain features of illusionary spectacle in early films, features also found in the window illusion described by Baum, has been noted by several authors. Tom Gunning defines early cinema as a cinema of attraction, characterized in particular by the prevalence of references to illusion and a fascination with tricks, and contrasts it with the narrative cinema that follows it. Frédéric Tabet, using the example of black theater, notes the existence of a "technical circulation" between the spectacle of illusion and the cinema of Méliès, for example in Le Magicien (1898), where the painted bust is transformed into a living character thanks to a camera stop, and where the empty space between the tripod legs, also painted, merges with the black background.

André Gaudreault has described this circulation of illusion - which is also that of the disappearing woman - between entresorts, shop windows and the nascent cinema as spontaneous intermediality, pointing out that, before it was recognized as a new medium, "the cinematograph was considered, among other things, as a means of providing entertainment in well-established 'genres' such as magic and enchantment. Henry Jenkins, for his part, sees a convergence of media, an effect he considers characteristic of a period of emerging new media.

L'Illusionniste fin de siècle (1899)

Two versions of Méliès's film, in which the escamotage theme hybridizes with that of Coppelia, half-model and half-automaton.

=== Baum's takeover of Méliès ===
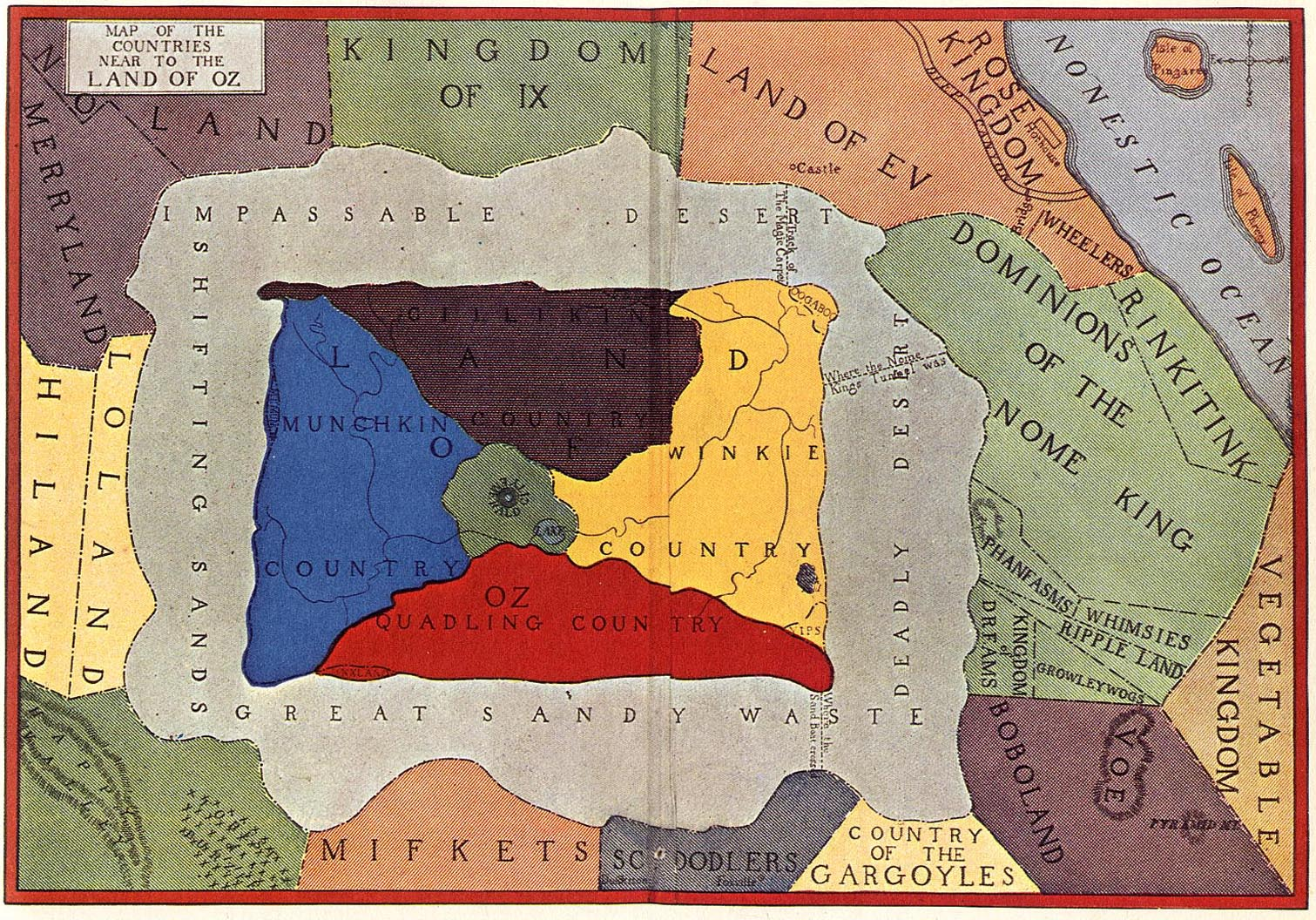
The Oz universe map allows consumers to link the various cultural products offered by Baum, using a color-coded advertising technique.

Baum's interest in illusion is not confined to window art and the Wizard of Oz, but is reflected in various aspects of a multi-media deployment of the Oz wonderland that has been analyzed in terms of transmediality. This analysis is based on two theses developed by Henry Jenkins: on the demand side, the existence of "migratory behavior" on the part of audiences, who move from one media to another to pursue the entertainment experiences they have come to enjoy; and on the supply side, the existence of a "multi-platform promotional strategy" designed to encourage consumers to move from one media domain to another in order to enrich their entertainment experience. In this analysis, Baum is described as a "cultural entrepreneur" who, drawing on his reflections on advertising developed in connection with the Art of Showcasing, promotes the Oz universe through different media - books, musicals and cinema - in order to encourage the public to increase consumption of the cultural products he offers, with each medium enriching and complementing the experience offered. According to this analysis, the promotional tools used by Baum, notably promotional comics and Oz pseudo-newspapers, play the same role of attraction as a store window.

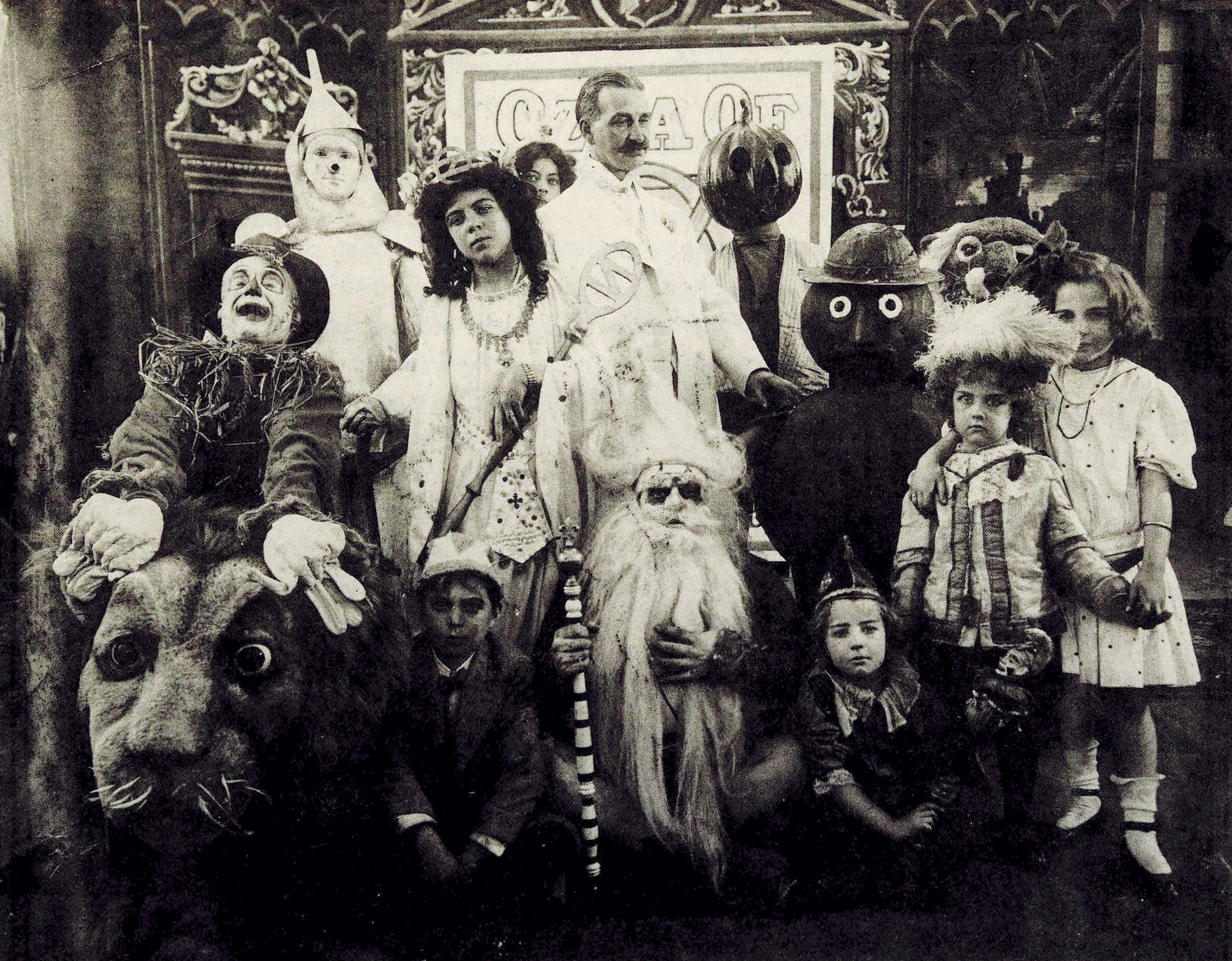
One of the few surviving photographs of the show Fairylogue and Radio-Plays (1908).

In 1908, Baum produced a multimedia show entitled The Fairylogue and Radio-Plays, a mysterious title that suggests the use of new technologies while evoking magic. It's a two-hour show combining parts played by actors, including Baum himself in the role of narrator, musical accompaniment in the auditorium, magic lantern views and colorized film footage. Although it is impossible to reconstruct the content of this traveling show, some details were known from an interview with Baum published in 1909 by the New York Herald. Baum's knowledge of Méliès' trick techniques, in particular substitution and superimposition, suggests a strong influence on the project, particularly from his short films Le Livre magique and Les Cartes vivantes (1904), with which the filmed parts (and colorized in Paris like the films of Méliès, who entrusted this work to Madame Thuilier) share the author's intervention as magician-demiurge and the idea of bringing the characters out of a "living book". The show turned out to be a financial drain: Baum had to stop performing after three months and sell the film adaptation rights to some of his books to William Selig.

Overlay trickery in the frozen heart scene from His Majesty, the Scarecrow of Oz (1914).

He did, however, make another attempt to adapt the Oz universe for the screen, producing three films based on it with his own studio between 1914 and 1915, which, despite impressive publicity claims, were technically uninnovative and commercially unsuccessful. As Ann Morey points out, the aim of these films was to "pictorialize" the fictional world of Oz, to "make its magic real enough to be filmable". But to do this, Baum relied on tricks such as those created by Méliès fifteen years earlier, which could only amaze a very young audience, as the informed public had lost its taste for trick films many years earlier. While Méliès's cinematic processes were perfectly suited to Baum's universe, they also confined the film to a register that excludes adult viewers, who feel cheated by the screening of a "children's" film and ask for their tickets to be refunded.

Tom Gunning notes that a characteristic feature of pre-1906 attraction cinema is what he calls its exhibitionist aspect, marked by the actors' recurrent gaze in the direction of the camera, which also characterizes the relationship of the women who disappear into the entresorts to their audience:

"This gesture, which would later be seen as spoiling the realistic illusion produced by cinema, then brilliantly establishes contact with the audience. From the grimacing of actors towards the camera to the constant curtsies and gesticulations of conjurers in magic films, this cinema flaunts its visibility and accepts to sacrifice the apparent autonomy of the fictional universe if it allows it to solicit the spectator's attention."

The detached head of Princess Ozma in The Patchwork Girl of Oz (1914).

Ann Morley points out that Baum's films are introduced and concluded by a sequence depicting the bodiless head of Princess Ozma, a recurring character in the series, which is supposed to act as a brand logo and entice viewers to buy books about the Land of Oz. This trickery, borrowed from Méliès who himself adapted black theater techniques to the cinema, is for Ann Morey "the richest promise of fantasy [in these films] because its effect is not cancelled out by the everydayness of the American landscape that clouds [in the rest of these films] our perception of the 'reality' of Oz". At the same time, it expresses a dependence on outdated visual codes: looking directly at the audience, it is closer to the "premier" cinema of pre-1906 than to the narrative cinema of its time. Morey also notes that this emblem betrays a form of genre confusion:

"Ozma's head, toasting and welcoming the audience, is the best possible example of the ambiguity of Baum's films. Because she is a woman and looks directly at the camera, her image promises an exhibitionist spectacle. However, the incomplete nature of this image neutralizes this project by suggesting a kind of child without a body, a figure so innocent that it has no bodily form at all, leaving nothing for those hoping for an exhibition to examine - or rather, leaving them with only a magical image that modifies their pleasure."

== Feminist analysis ==
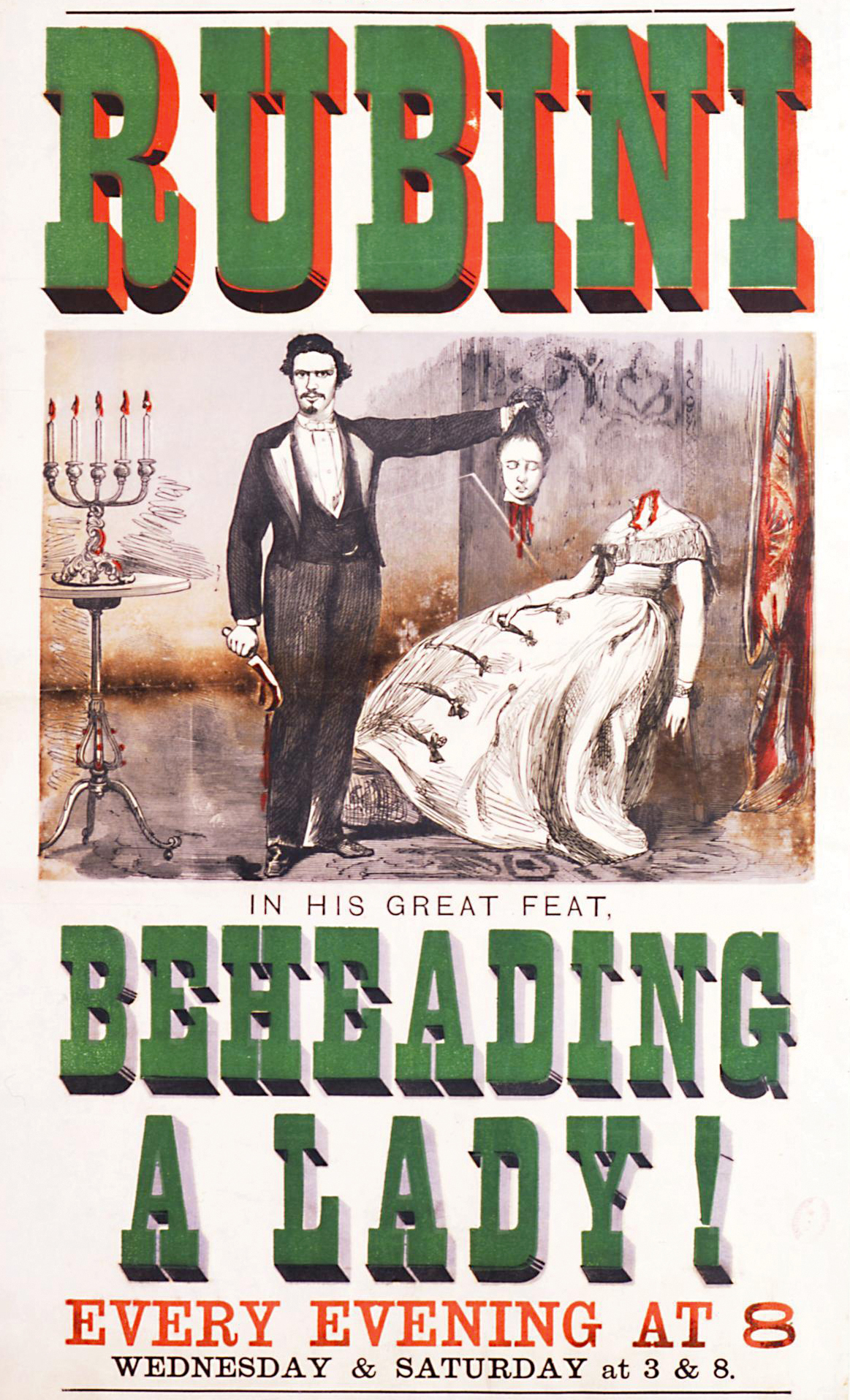
In 1869, Rubini, Stodare's successor at the Egyptian Hall, beheaded his female companion with "discreet nonchalance".

Although Baum was the son-in-law of a militant feminist, Matilda Joslyn Gage, and his biographers attribute feminist conceptions to him, several authors, struck by the recurrence of the theme of the disappearance of women in the performing arts from the 19th century onwards, have questioned the role of this figure.

In an article published in 1979, Lucy Fischer provides one of the first analyses of this problematic. Fischer notes that the escamotage of a lady is the first occurrence of a substitution trick recurrent in Méliès and constitutive of a "cinematographic archetype", the performance of a marvellous trick by a male actor on a female subject, which she sees as founding a certain cinematographic vision of women. She notes that this "cliché" is part of a theatrical magic tradition, and suggests that illusionists who make their female assistants disappear were complying with a tradition that is not arbitrary, but that they were "articulating a discourse on attitudes towards women": by making them disappear or reappear at will, the illusionists "demonstrate their power" over them; by dematerializing and "decorporanting" them, they reduce them to the rank of spirits, with an unfathomable mystery. (Note: Francesca Coppa develops these analyses by considering that theatrical illusion divides performers into two categories, "capital (male) and labor (female), exaggerating the distinction in such a way that male magicians are defined as possessors of restricted magical knowledge and female assistants are doubly determined as non-magicians, in that they are salaried helpers and do not belong to the rarefied circle of magicians within which knowledge is shared and transmitted, and in that they are determined in magical performance as hypnotized, asleep, unconscious or empty-minded - literally as lacking the intellectual means to perform the magician's work") Fischer further suggests that this "masculine need to exert his power" reflects an opposite sentiment: "if our male magician was so sure of his power over women, why should he subject us ceaselessly to repeated demonstrations of it?"

According to Linda Williams, this scene from Illusions funambulesques (1903) illustrates Méliès' "mastery of dismemberment".

In particular, Fischer's analysis has been challenged by Linda Williams. According to her, while Fischer is "right to emphasize the significance of magic exerting power over women's bodies, disembodying them and reducing them to the status of decorative objects", it is wrong to assert that more women than men disappear in Méliès films. On the other hand, Williams points out that Méliès, even before acquiring in 1888 the theater of Jean-Eugène Robert-Houdin, himself a famous automaton builder, had built several between 1885 and 1888 in imitation of Robert-Houdin. According to Williams, there is something "fascinating" in the fact that Méliès, behind the camera, cinematically simulates the mechanical simulations of his predecessors, the object of which, she argues, is to give the automaton designer "complete control" over the appearance and movements of his creation, as Méliès cinematically perfects the "mastery of the threatening presence of an actual body, by investing his pleasure in an infinitely repeatable trickery". For Williams, trickery enabled Méliès to "master the threat of castration posed by the illusory presence of women", by staging the "dismemberment and reintegration" of a body and celebrating "the fetish function of the device itself, particularly in its ability to reproduce the female body".

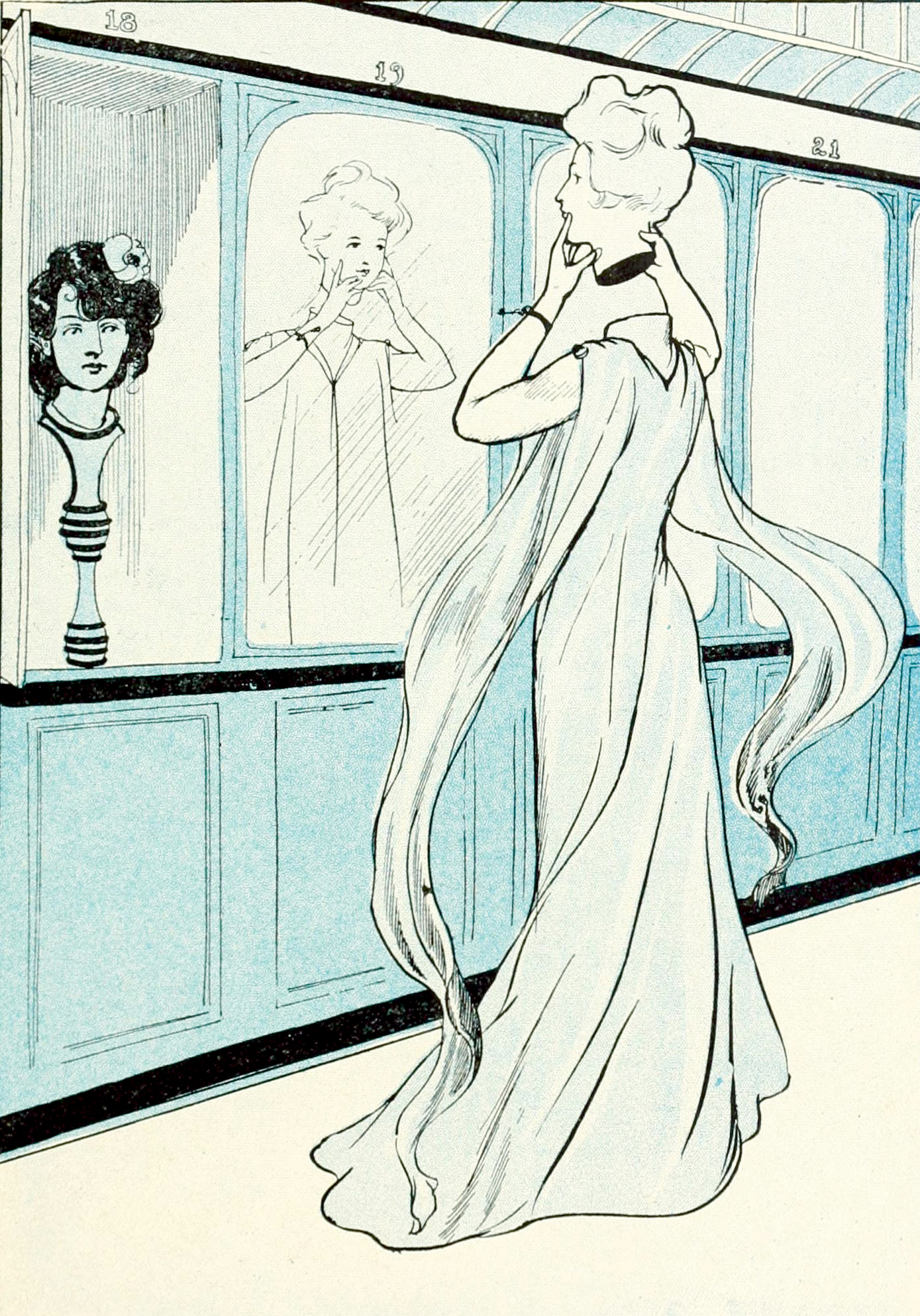
Illustration by John Neill for Ozma, Princess of Oz (1907). According to Mary Ann Doane, the cinematic image is for the spectator "both window and mirror, the former being a means of access to the latter ".

In several texts published between 1991 and 1993, Anne Friedberg contextualizes the window illusion described by Baum. Friedberg refers to Walter Benjamin's analysis of the urban flâneur, the consumer-spectator to whom the city opens up like a landscape while enclosing him like a room. She points out that, in the second half of the 19th century, women simultaneously became the object of visual "consumption" by male flâneurs and, as flâneuses, the "foragers" of the "phantasmagoria" (Note: Elizabeth Carlson notes that the proliferation of mirrors in department stores at the end of the 19th century was based on their "phantasmagorical" theatrical function.) produced for them in the windows of department stores, the latter simultaneously offering them a "safe place" of consumption sheltered from male covetousness. Friedberg also points out that Baum's conception of the shop window, illustrated by his praise of the Vanishing Lady installation, is based on a "clear analogy" with the cinema screen: "the shop window delimits a picture; by putting it behind glass and making it inaccessible, it arouses desire [...] it succeeds the mirror as a place for the construction of identity, then - gradually - it is displaced towards and incorporated into the cinema screen".

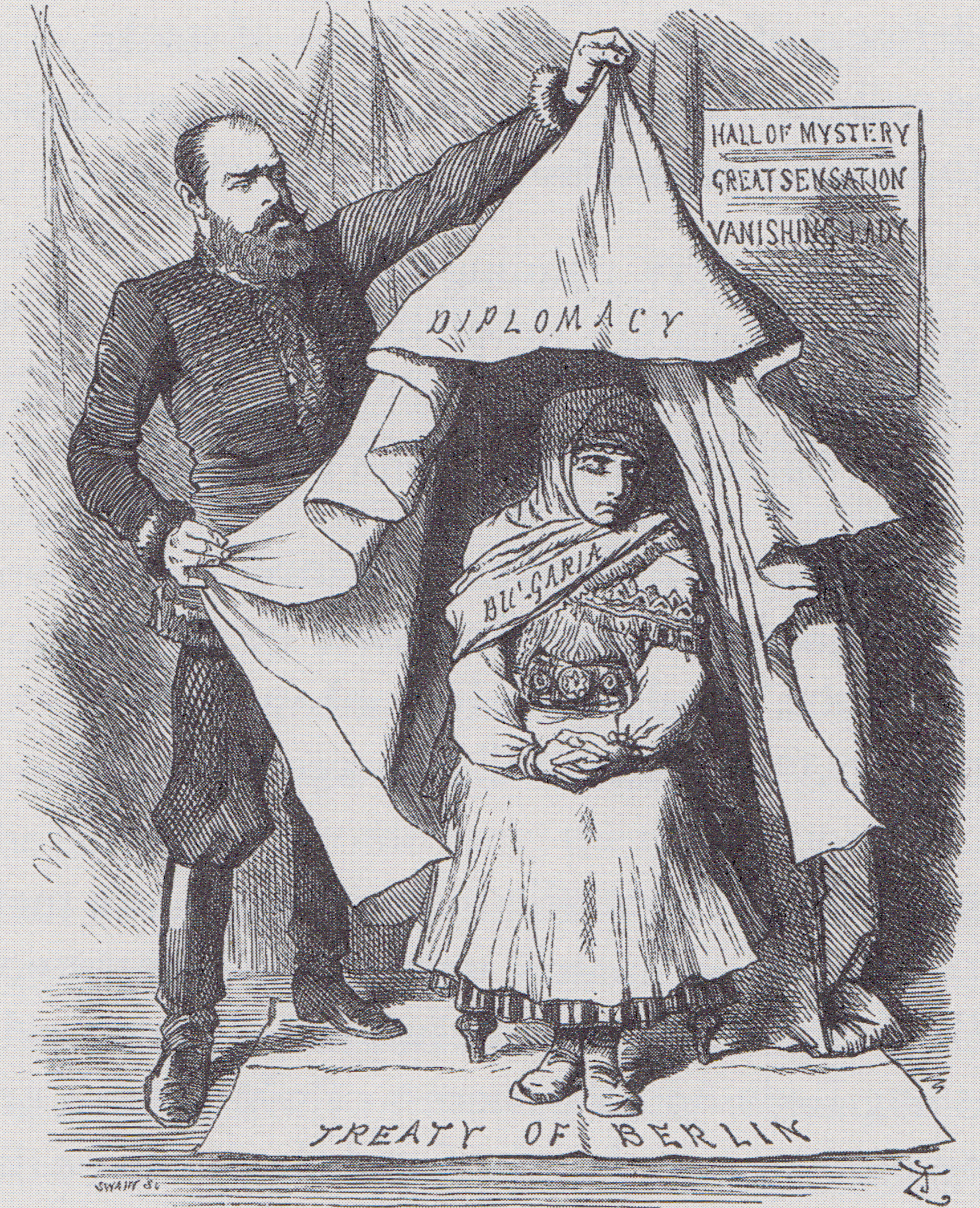
Cartoon on Russia's "escamotage" of Bulgaria in 1886 manifesting, according to Beckman, the misogynistic violence inherent in the trick.

In an essay published in 2003, Karen Beckman gives the Vanishing Lady described by Baum as a particularly significant example "of desire and repudiation". Beckman sees this installation as a "strange moment" on the border between two centuries, beckoning "nostalgically" towards the vanishing tradition of entresorts and show magic, but also "impatiently" towards the newly emerging world of cinema, which

"On the one hand, it attempts to contain the female body by controlling its mobility. On the other hand, it attempts to contain the female body by controlling its mobility, dismembering it and securing it on one foot to reassure spectators that this woman, elusive as she seems to be, isn't going anywhere. But on the other hand, the show simultaneously participates in a misogynistic discourse that fantasizes the complete eradication of all women. The fate of the lower part of her body has already been settled, and each new disappearance implies that what's left of the body will follow the same fate as the legs."

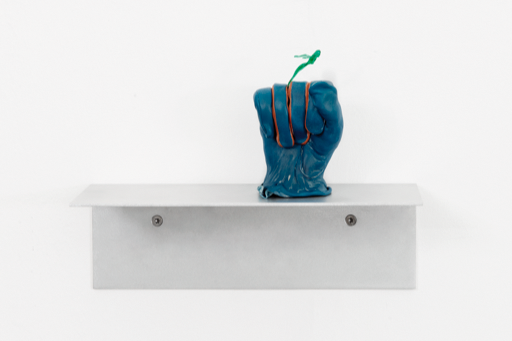
The Vanishing Lady by Émilie Pitoiset (2017), presented in Berlin in 2017 as part of the eponymous exhibition.

According to Beckman, the Vanishing Lady's subsequent popularity in cinema can be explained by the fact that, by making a spectacle of her body's disappearance, she becomes a "perfect emblem of the cinematic image, which constantly struggles with the difficulty of fixing the image of the woman on the screen". More generally, she believes that the elisions created by illusion open up the question of what might have been lost to view: "the spectacle of disappearance is politically useful because it intimates a greater visual acuity on the part of the spectator, arousing anxiety and curiosity about the status of other people's bodies."

== Relationship with The Wizard of Oz ==
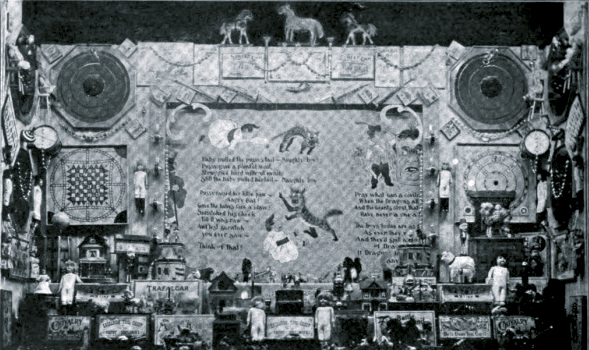
Showcase using Denslow's illustrations for Mon père l'Oye. (Note: Baum gives this window display as an example of "clever" decoration, believing that Denslow's illustrations "lend themselves particularly well to display because of their vivid colors ")

In 1897, the same year he launched The Show Window, Frank Baum published the storybook Mother Goose in Prose, illustrated by Maxfield Parrish, the former's first children's book and the latter's first illustrated book. However, the book came out too late to take advantage of Christmas sales, and was not a great success with children, although the illustrations were appreciated by adults. In 1899, Baum published Father Goose: His Book, his first success with a children's audience and the first of his books to be illustrated by Denslow. In 1900, at the same time as assembling a compilation of the best texts from The Show Window magazine for the publication of The Art of Decorating Show Windows and Dry Goods Interiors, Baum completed the manuscript of The Wonderful Wizard of Oz, his most famous fairy tale. As William Leach notes, "jewels, lights, colors, mannequins, shop windows, images, photographs and display tricksterism (Note: The English term trickster refers to the deceiver, the one who deceives or betrays.) flowed into the crucible of The Wizard of Oz's design". He also stresses the coherence between the Land of Oz and the "consumer paradise" that Baum believed the shop window designer should strive to represent. Richard Flynn continues this analysis, pointing out that Baum, having established his credibility in the children's book market with his first publications, adopted a commercial vision of the Oz universe, seeking to develop derivative products through various media, including musicals and film, but also toys.

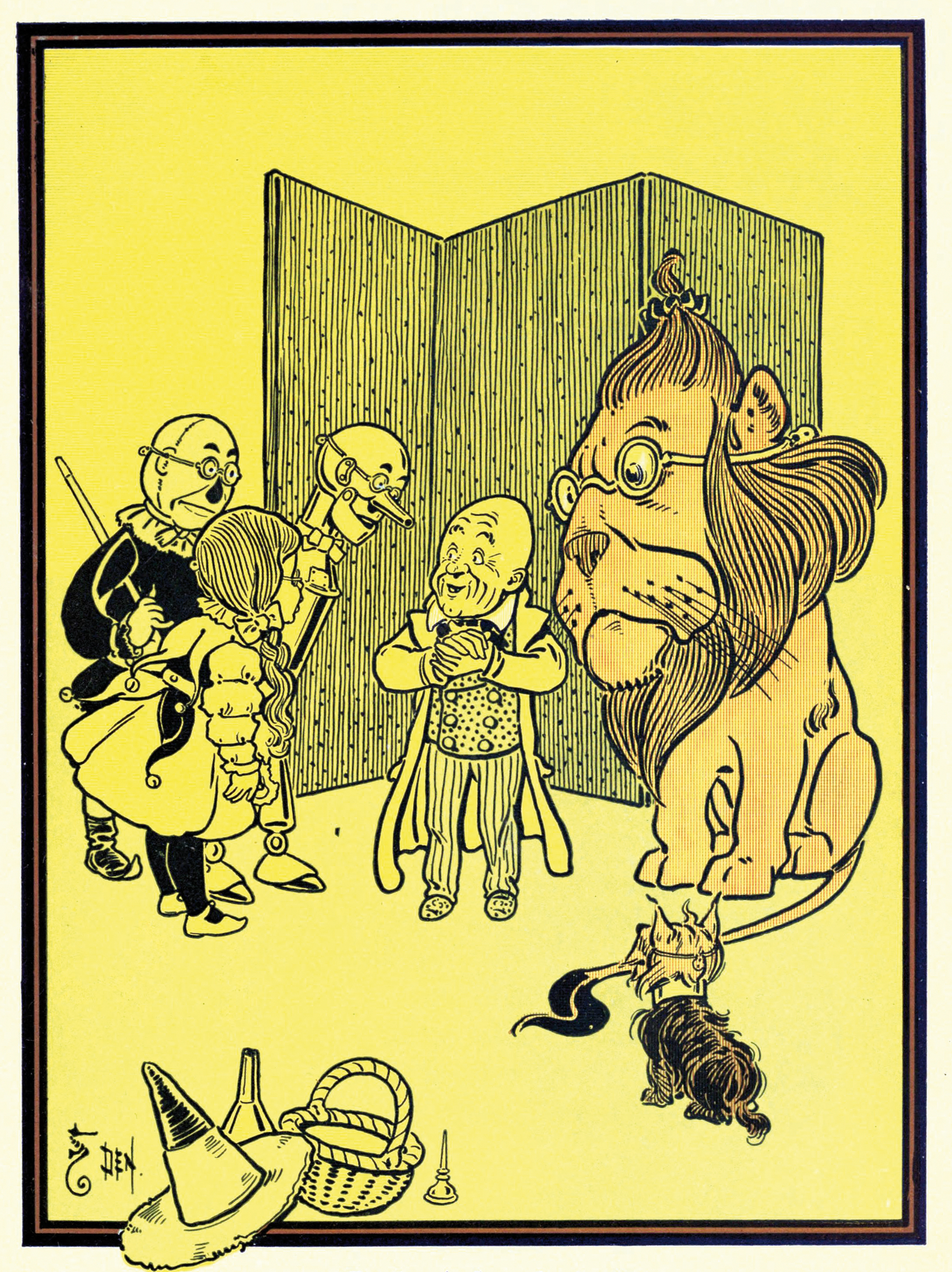
Denslow's illustration for The Wizard of Oz: "Exactly!" declared the little man, rubbing his hands together [...] "I'm a charlatan ".

In the introduction to The Wizard of Oz, Baum points out that "the time has come to renew the genre of the fairy tale", that "contemporary children seek only entertainment in fairy tales", and that this work "aspires to be a modernized fairy tale". William Leach considers that one of the main components of this modernization, along with the anchoring in New Thought and the importance of the role assigned to color, is the use of the trickster figure, widely diffused in the United States at the time The Wizard of Oz was conceived. Leach refers to historian Neil Harris's analysis of the influence of Phineas Taylor Barnum and the emergence in the United States in the second half of the 19th century of an attraction to "operational aesthetics", an interest in the operative processes at work in humbug. According to Harris, "Barnum understood that the possibility of debating the falsity [of an attraction], of understanding how the deception came about, was basically as interesting a subject as the presentation of authentic curiosities". Leach points out that American tricksters of the 1890s "manipulated materials, technologies, ideas, objects and other people to create impressions, illusions, phantasmagoria and machines"; and that "not only did the American [public] expect artifice and deception, but they also consciously looked behind the stage (or behind the machine) to try to understand how they had been deceived". As Michael Leja and Tom Gunning also point out, the success of optical illusions and early cinema in late nineteenth-century America was not necessarily due to naiveté, but rather to a fascination with the mechanisms at work.

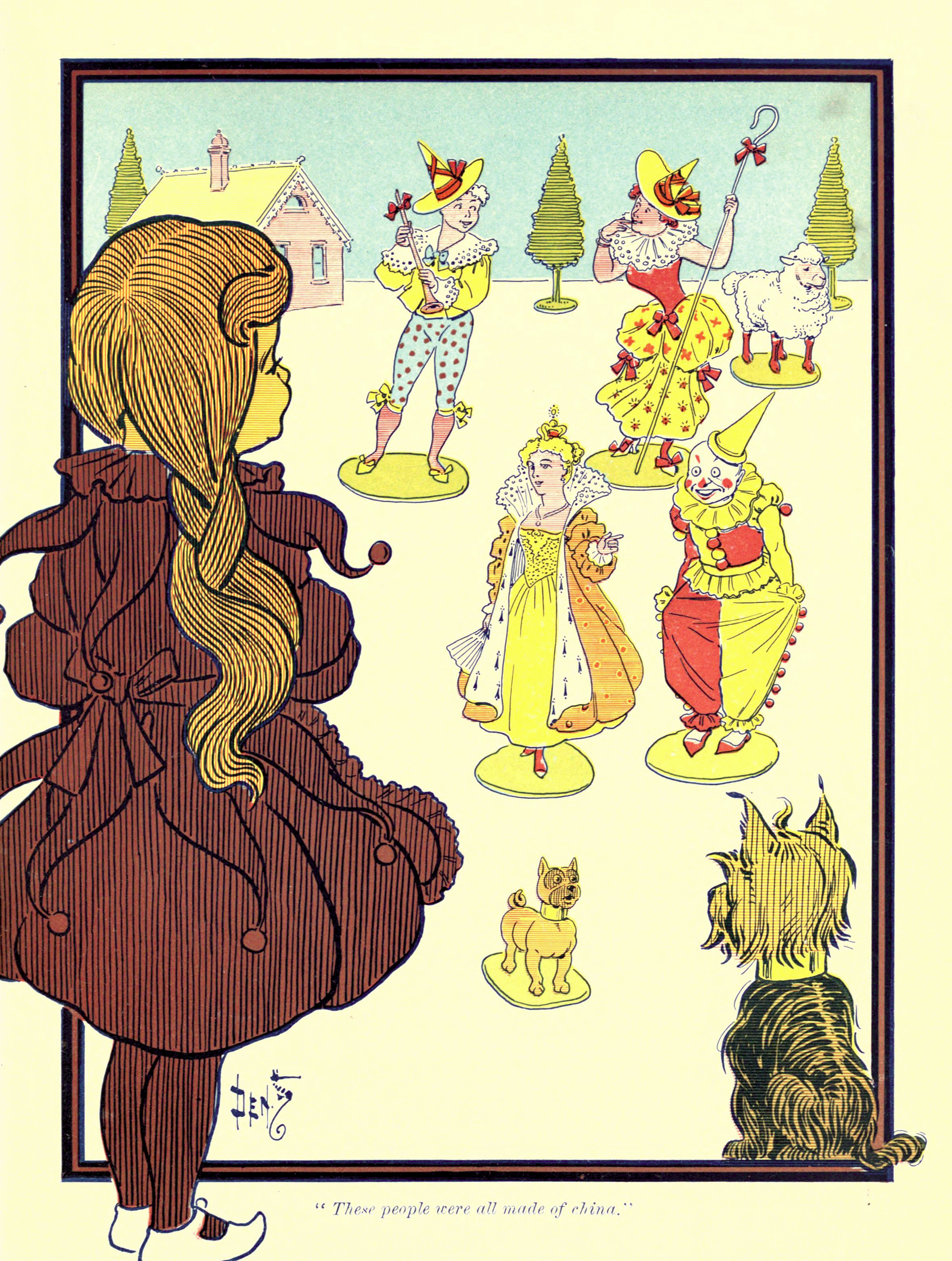
In The Wizard of Oz, Dorothy's decision not to bring a porcelain figurine back to Kansas proves the seductive power of the "shop window".

According to Baum's son, the latter "was the Wizard of Oz", Leach analyzes the tale as a tribute to the "modern ability to create magic, illusions and theater" and "to all those new activities and strategies of manipulation and artifice - merchandising, advertising, new commercial theater, new spiritual therapies and the whole spectacle of American technological inventiveness - that constituted so much of the new American economy and culture".

For Stuart Culver, The Wizard of Oz "dramatizes the relationship between consumer desire and modern beliefs about human identity" and is "a unique, perhaps even bizarre, attempt to explain how the mannequin works in advertising art by representing the conditions under which it might come to life", "not because it possesses some crucial spiritual qualities, but rather because it feels a certain desire". Culver likens this problem to that of the window dresser, for whom the mannequin is "a mechanical substitute designed to arouse the consumer's desire and steer him in the direction of a certain product category", a substitute that will only work if it projects the image of a complete body while representing its lack and without erasing its desire.

This analysis overlaps in part with that of Slavoj Žižek, cited by Karen Beckman in connection with the cinematic theme of the disappearing woman. According to Žižek,

"It's hard not to recognize in this ghostly figure [of the disappearing woman] the appearance of the Woman, the "complete" woman who could fill man's lack, be his complement and not his supplement, his ideal partner with whom a sexual relationship would finally be possible - in short, the Woman who [...] precisely does not exist."

== See also ==
- Au Bonheur des Dames
- The Vanishing Lady
- The Wonderful Wizard of Oz

== Bibliography ==
- Abelson, Elaine (1989). When Ladies Go A'Thieving: Middle-Class Shoplifters in the Victorian Department Store. New York: Oxford University Press.
- Baum, Frank (1900). The Art of Decorating Dry Goods Windows and Interiors. Chicago: The Show Window Publishing Company.
- Baum, Frank; Leach, William (1991), The Wonderful Wizard of Oz, Wadsworth
- Baum, L. Frank; Hearn, Michael Patrick (2000) [First published 1973]. The Annotated Wizard of Oz: The Wonderful Wizard of Oz. New York: W. W. Norton & Company. ISBN 0-393-04992-2.
- Beckman, Karen (2003). Vanishing Women: Magic, Film, and Feminism. Duke University Press.
- Benjamin, Walter (2009). Paris, capitale du xixe siècle. Paris: Cerf.
- Cook, James W. (2001). The Arts of Deception: Playing with Fraud in the Age of Barnum. Cambridge: Harvard University Press.
- Culver, Stuart (Winter 1988). "What Manikins Want: The Wonderful Wizard of Oz and The Art of Decorating Dry Goods Windows". Representations. 21 (21). University of California Press: 97–116. doi:10.2307/2928378. JSTOR 2928378.
- Hopkins, Albert Allis (1898). Magic; Stage Illusions and Scientific Diversions, Including Trick Photography. New York: Munn.
- Leach, William (1984). "Transformations in a Culture of Consumption: Women and Department Stores, 1890-1925". The Journal of American History. 71 (2): 319–342. doi:10.2307/1901758. JSTOR 1901758.
- Leach, William (1993). Land of Desire: Merchants, Power, and the Rise of a New American Culture. New York: Pantheon Books.
- Leja, Michael (2004). Looking Askance: Skepticism and American Art from Eakins to Duchamp. Berkeley: University of California Press.
- Loncraine, Rebecca (2009). The Real Wizard of Oz: The Life and Times of L. Frank Baum. New York: Gotham Books.
- Maxwell, Fiona (Spring 2018). "All the Window's a Stage: Theatricality and Show Window Display, 1897-1917". Ezra's Archives. 8 (1).
- Orr, Emily M. (2019). Designing the Department Store: Display and Retail at the Turn of the Twentieth Century. New York: Bloomsbury Publishing.
- Reading, Amy (2013). The Lady Vanishes. The Appendix.
- Steinmeyer, Jim (2003). Hiding the Elephant. Londres: Arrow Books.
- Tabet, Frédéric (2018). Le cinématographe des magiciens: 1896-1906, un cycle magique. Rennes: Presses universitaires de Rennes.
