= Georges Méliès filmography =

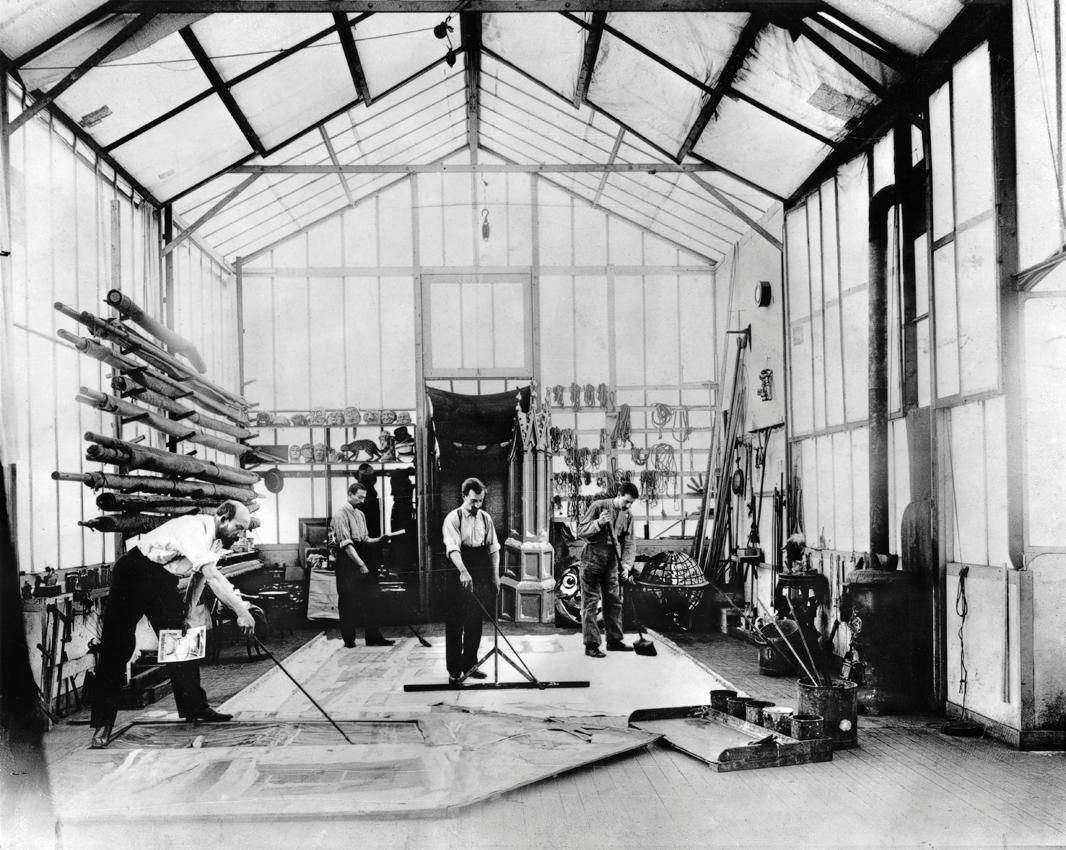
Méliès (at left) in his Montreuil studio

Georges Méliès (1861–1938) was a French filmmaker and magician generally regarded as the first person to recognize the potential of narrative film. He made about 520 films between 1896 and 1912, covering a range of genres including trick films, fantasies, comedies, advertisements, satires, costume dramas, literary adaptations, erotic films, melodramas, and imaginary voyages. His works are often considered as important precursors to modern narrative cinema, though some recent scholars have argued that Méliès's films are better understood as spectacular theatrical creations rooted in the 19th-century féerie tradition.

After attending the first demonstration of the Lumière Brothers' Cinematographe in December 1895, he bought a film projector from the British film pioneer Robert W. Paul and began using it to project short films at his theater of illusions, the Théâtre Robert-Houdin, in Paris. Having studied the principles on which Paul's projector ran, Méliès was able to modify the machine so that it could be used as a makeshift camera. He began making his own films with it in May 1896, founded the Star Film Company in the same year, and built his own studio in Montreuil, Seine-Saint-Denis in 1897. His films A Trip to the Moon (1902), The Kingdom of the Fairies (1903), and The Impossible Voyage (1904) were among the most popular films of the first few years of the twentieth century, and Méliès built a second, larger studio in 1907. However, a combination of difficulties—including American film piracy, standardized film prices set in 1908 by the Motion Picture Patents Company, and a decline in popularity of fantasy films—led eventually to Méliès's financial ruin and the closing of his studio. His last films were made in 1912 under the supervision of the rival studio Pathé, and in 1922–23 Méliès sold his studios, closed the Théâtre Robert-Houdin, and discarded his own collection of his negative and positive prints. In 1925 he began selling toys and candy from a stand in the Gare Montparnasse in Paris. Thanks to the efforts of film history devotées, especially René Clair, Jean George Auriol, and Paul Gilson, Méliès and his work were rediscovered in the late 1920s, and he was awarded the Legion of Honor in 1931.

In the list below, Méliès's films are numbered according to their order in the catalogues of the Star Film Company. In Méliès's numbering system, films were listed and numbered according to their order of production, and each catalogue number denotes about 20 meters of film (thus, for example, A Trip to the Moon, at about 260 meters long, is listed as #399–411). The original French release titles, as well as the original titles used in the US and UK versions of the Star Film catalogues, are listed in the body of the filmography; notable variant titles are provided in smaller text. The parenthetical descriptive subtitles used in the catalogues (e.g. scène comique) are also provided whenever possible. Films directed by Méliès but not originally released by the Star Film Company (such as The Coronation of Edward VII, released by Charles Urban, or The Conquest of the Pole, released by Pathé Frères) are also included. Where available, the list also includes information on whether each film survives, survives in fragmentary form, or is presumed lost. Unless otherwise referenced, the information presented here is derived from the 2008 filmography prepared by Jacques Malthête, augmented by filmographies prepared in the 1970s by Paul Hammond and John Frazer.

== List of films ==
| # | English title(s) | French title | Status |
|---|---|---|---|
1896 -
| 1 | Playing Cards | Une partie de cartes | Survives |
| 2 | Conjuring | Séance de prestidigitation | Survives |
| 3 | Smarter Than the Teacher (1st bicycle lesson) | Plus fort que le maître (leçon de bicyclette) | Lost |
| 4 | Gardener Burning Weeds | Jardinier brûlant des herbes | Lost |
| 5 | A Merry-go-Round | Les Chevaux de bois | Lost |
| 6 | Watering the Flowers (comical subject) | L'Arroseur | Lost |
| 7 | The Washerwomen | Les Blanchisseuses | Lost |
| 8 | Arrival of a Train at Vincennes Station | Arrivée d'un train (gare de Vincennes) | Lost |
| 9 | The Rag-Picker, or a Good Joke | Une bonne farce (le chiffonnier) | Lost |
| 10 | Place de l'Opéra, 1st view (Paris) | Place de l'Opéra (1^{er} aspect) | Lost |
| 11 | Place du Théâtre-Français (Paris) | Place du Théâtre-Français | Lost |
| 12 | A Little Rascal | Un petit diable | Lost |
| 13 | Coronation of a Village Maiden (French customs) | Couronnement de la rosière | Lost |
| 14 | Baby and Young Girls | Bébé et Fillettes | Lost |
| 15 | Post No Bills | Défense d'afficher | Survives |
| 16 | Steamboats on River Seine | Bateaux-Mouches sur la Seine | Lost |
| 17 | Place de l'Opéra, 2d view (Paris) | Place de l'Opéra (2^{e} aspect) | Lost |
| 18 | Boulevard des Italiens (Paris) | Boulevard des Italiens | Lost |
| 19 | Academy for Young Ladies | Un lycée de jeunes filles | Lost |
| 20 | Bois de Boulogne (Touring Club, Paris) | Bois de Boulogne (Touring Club) | Lost |
| 21 | Bois de Boulogne (Porte de Madrid, Paris) | Bois de Boulogne (Porte de Madrid) | Lost |
| 22 | The Rescue on the River (1st part) | Sauvetage en rivière (1^{re} partie) | Lost |
| 23 | The Rescue on the River (2d part) | Sauvetage en rivière (2^{e} partie) | Lost |
| 24 | French Regiment Going to the Parade | Le Régiment | Lost |
| 25 | Gipsies at Home | Campement de bohémiens | Lost |
| 26 | A Terrible Night | Une nuit terrible | Survives (Note: Malthête's 2008 filmography lists No. 26, Une nuit terrible, as surviving and No. 190, Un bon lit, as lost. However, Méliès's great-great-granddaughter, Pauline Méliès, published findings in 2013 suggesting that the film previously believed to be No. 26 is actually No. 190, and that the actual No. 26 survives in two print copies. If this hypothesis is true, both films survive.) |
| 27 | Unloading the Boat (Havre) | Déchargement de bateaux (Le Havre) | Lost |
| 28 | The Beach at Villers in a Gale (France) | Plage de Villers par gros temps | Lost |
| 29 | The Docks at Marseilles (France) | Les Quais à Marseille | Lost |
| 30 | Beach and Pier at Trouville (France) | Jetée et plage de Trouville (1^{re} partie) | Lost |
| 31 | Boat Leaving the Harbor of Trouville | Barque sortant du port de Trouville | Lost |
| 32 | Beach and Pier at Trouville (2d part) | Jetée et plage de Trouville (2^{e} partie) | Lost |
| 33 | Market Day (Trouville) | Jour de marché à Trouville | Lost |
| 34 | Panorama of Havre Taken From a Boat | Panorama du Havre (pris d'un bateau) | Lost |
| 35 | Arrival of a Train (Joinville Station) | Arrivée d'un train (gare de Joinville) | Survives |
| 36 | A Soldier's Unlucky Salutation | Salut malencontreux Also known as Salut malencontreux d'un déserteur | Survives |
| 37 | A Lightning Sketch (Mr. Thiers) | Dessinateur express (M. Thiers) | Lost |
| 38 | Blacksmith in His Workshop | Les Forgerons (vue d'atelier) | Lost |
| 39 | A Janitor in Trouble | Tribulations d'un concierge | Lost |
| 40 | Sea Bathing | Baignade en mer | Lost |
| 41 | Children Playing on the Beach | Enfants jouant sur la plage | Lost |
| 42 | Conjurer Making Ten Hats in Sixty Seconds | Dix Chapeaux en soixante secondes | Survives (Note: A flipbook, published by Léon Beaulieu in the late 1890s, was rediscovered in the 2010s and has been tentatively identified as a fragment of the film.) |
| 43 | Sea Breaking on the Rocks | Effet de mer sur les rochers | Lost |
| 44 | A Serpentine Dance | Danse serpentine | Fragment? |
| 45 | Miss de Vère (English jig) | Miss de Vère (gigue anglaise) | Fragment? |
| 46 | Automobiles Starting on a Race | Départ des automobiles | Lost |
| 47 | A Naval Review at Cherbourg | Revue navale à Cherbourg | Lost |
| 48 | The Czar and His Cortège Going to Versailles | Cortège du Tzar allant à Versailles | Lost |
| 49 | Towing a Boat on the River | Les Haleurs de bateaux | Lost |
| 50 | The Czar's Cortège in the Bois de Boulogne | Cortège du Tzar au Bois de Boulogne | Lost |
| 51 | Closing Hours at Vibert's Perfume Factory (Paris) | Sortie des ateliers Vibert | Lost |
| 52 | The Potter's Cart | La Voiture du potier | Lost |
| 53 | The Mysterious Paper | Le Papier protée | Lost |
| 54 | Place de la Concorde (Paris) | Place de la Concorde | Lost |
| 55 | St. Lazare Railroad Station (Paris) | La Gare Saint-Lazare | Lost |
| 56 | Manoeuvres of the French Army | Grandes Manœuvres | Lost |
| 57 | A Lightning Sketch (Chamberlain) | Dessinateur (Chamberlain) | Lost |
| 58 | Place de la Bastille (Paris) | Place de la Bastille | Lost |
| 59 | Tide Rising Over the Breakwater | Marée montante sur brise-lames | Lost |
| 60 | Return to the Barracks | Retour au cantonnement | Lost |
| 61 | A Lightning Sketch (H.M. Queen Victoria) | Dessinateur (Reine Victoria) | Lost |
| 62 | French Officers' Meeting | Réunion d'officiers | Lost |
| 63 | The Pier at Tréport During a Storm (France) | Tempête sur la jetée du Tréport | Lost |
| 64 | The Bivouac | Le Bivouac | Lost |
| 65 | Threshing-Machine Worked by Power; Also known as Threshing Machines Worked by Power | Batteuse à vapeur | Lost |
| 66 | Sacks Up! | Sac au dos! | Lost |
| 67 | Breaking up of the Territorial Army (France) | Libération des territoriaux | Lost |
| 68 | Officers of French Army Leaving Service | Départ des officiers | Lost |
| 69 | Place Saint-Augustin (Paris) | Place Saint-Augustin | Lost |
| 70 | The Vanishing Lady | Escamotage d'une dame chez Robert-Houdin | Survives |
| 71 | The Fakir (a Hindoo mystery) | Le Fakir (mystère indien) | Lost |
| 72 | A Badly Managed Hotel | L'Hôtel empoisonné | Lost |
| 73 | A Lightning Sketch (Von Bismarck) | Dessinateur (Von Bismarck) | Lost |
| 74 | The Peeping Toms | Les Indiscrets | Lost |
| 75 | Tom Old Boot (a grotesque dwarf) | Tom Old Boot (nain grotesque) | Lost |
| 76 | A Quarrel in a Café | Une altercation au café | Lost |
| 77 | The Drunkards | Les Ivrognes | Lost |
1896–1897 -
| 78–80 | The Haunted Castle (US); The Devil's Castle (UK) | Le Manoir du diable | Survives |
| 81 | An Up-to-Date Dentist | Chicot, dentiste américain | Lost |
| 82 | A Nightmare | Le Cauchemar | Survives |
1897 -
| 83–84 | The Mardi Gras Procession (Paris, 1897) | Le Cortège du Bœuf gras passant place de la Concorde | Lost |
| 85 | The Mardi Gras Procession (Paris, 1898) [sic] | Cortège du Bœuf gras, boulevard des Italiens | Lost |
| 86 | A Farm Yard | Une cour de ferme | Lost |
| 87 | Military Apprentices | Les Apprentis militaires | Lost |
| 88 | Comedian Paulus Singing "Derrière l'Omnibus" | Paulus chantant: Derrière l'omnibus | Lost |
| 89 | Comedian Paulus Singing "Coquin de Printemps" | Paulus chantant: Coquin de printemps | Lost |
| 90 | Comedian Paulus Singing "Duelliste Marsellais" | Paulus chantant: Duelliste marseillais | Lost |
| 91 | Firemen on Parade | Défilé des pompiers | Lost |
| 92 | Dancing Girls (Jardin de Paris) | Danseuses au Jardin de Paris | Lost |
| 93 | An Imaginary Patient | Le Malade imaginaire | Lost |
| 94 | A Funny Mahometan | Le Musulman rigolo | Lost |
| 95 | An Hallucinated Alchemist | L'Hallucination de l'alchimiste | Lost |
| 96 | The Devil's Castle (US); The Haunted Castle (UK) | Le Château hanté | Survives |
| 97–98 | Mid-Lent Procession in Paris | Cortège de la Mi-Carême | Lost |
| 99 | Battle With Confetti | Bataille de confettis | Lost |
| 100 | On the Roofs | Sur les toits (cambrioleurs et gendarmes) | Survives |
| 101 | D. Devant, Conjurer | D. Devant (prestidigitation) | Fragment? |
| 102 | The School for Sons-in-law | L'École des gendres | Lost |
| 103–104 | War Episodes | Épisode de guerre | Lost |
| 105 | The Last Cartridges | Bombardement d'une maison (reconstitution de la scène des Dernières Cartouches) | Survives |
| 106 | The Surrender of Tournavos | La Prise de Tournavos | Survives |
| 107 | Execution of a Spy | Exécution d'un espion | Lost |
| 108 | Massacre in Crete | Massacres en Crète | Lost |
| 109 | A Dangerous Pass (Mont Blanc) | Passage dangereux (Mont-Blanc) | Lost |
| 110 | Sea Fighting in Greece | Combat naval en Grèce | Survives |
| 111 | Gugusse and the Automaton | Gugusse et l'Automate | Survives |
| 112 | Between Dover and Calais; Also known as Between Calais and Dover | Entre Calais et Douvres | Survives |
| 113 | Peeping Tom at the Seaside | L'Indiscret aux bains de mer | Lost |
| 114 | Behind the Scenes | Dans les coulisses (scène comique dans un théâtre) | Lost |
| 115 | A Potterymaker | Tourneur en poterie | Lost |
| 116 | The Grasshopper and the Ant | La Cigale et la Fourmi | Lost |
| 117 | A Balloon Ascension (very comical) | Ascension d'un ballon | Lost |
| 118–120 | Laboratory of Mephistopheles | Le Cabinet de Méphistophélès | Lost |
| 121 | The Barber and the Farmer | Figaro et l'Auvergnat | Survives |
| 122–123 | The Bewitched Inn | L'Auberge ensorcelée | Survives |
| 124 | Auguste and Bibb | Auguste et Bibb | Lost |
| 125 | A Twentieth Century Surgeon | Chirurgien américain | Lost |
| 126 | The Charcoal Man's Reception | Arlequin et Charbonnier | Lost |
| 127 | A Private Dinner | En cabinet particulier | Lost |
| 128 | After the Ball | Après le bal (le tub) | Survives |
| 129 | A Hypnotist at Work (US); While Under a Hypnotist's Influence (UK) | Le Magnétiseur | Lost |
| 130–131 | An Irritable Model | Le Modèle irascible | Lost |
| 132 | Dancing in a Harem | Danse au sérail | Unknown (Note: The Méliès scholar John Frazer was unable to obtain a print, but speculated that a fragment may survive in Budapest.) |
| 133 | Slave Trading in a Harem | Vente d'esclaves au harem | Lost |
| 134 | Fighting in the Streets in India | Combat dans une rue aux Indes | Lost |
| 135 | Attack of an English Blockhouse | Attaque d'un poste anglais | Lost |
| 136 | Boxing Match | Match de boxe (professeurs de l'École de Joinville) | Fragment? |
| 137 | A Drunkard's Dream | Vision d'ivrogne | Lost |
1897–1898 -
| 138 | Faust and Marguerite | Faust et Marguerite | Lost (Note: Paul Hammond reported in 1974 that the film had survived, but it is classified as lost in John Frazer's 1979 revision of Hammond's filmography as well as in Jacques Malthête's 2008 filmography.) |
| 139 | Place de l'Opéra, 3d view (Paris) | Carrefour de l'Opéra | Lost |
| 140–141 | Black Art (US); Devilish Magic (UK) | Magie diabolique | Lost |
1898 -
| 142 | A Novice at X-Rays | Les Rayons X | Lost |
| 143 | Collision and Shipwreck at Sea | Collision et Naufrage en mer | Lost |
| 144–145 | The Blowing up of the "Maine" in Havana Harbor | Quais de La Havane (Explosion du cuirassé Le Maine) | Lost |
| 146 | A View of the Wreck of the "Maine" | Visite de l'épave du Maine | Lost |
| 147 | Divers at Work on the Wreck of the "Maine" (US); Divers at Work on a Wreck Under Sea (UK) | Visite sous-marine du Maine (plongeurs et poissons vivants) | Survives |
| 148 | Fencing at the Joinville School | Assaut d'escrime (École de Joinville) | Fragment? |
| 149 | A Clumsy Mason | Le Maçon maladroit | Lost |
| 150 | Defending the Fort at Manila (US); Defending the Fort (UK) | Combat naval devant Manille | Lost |
| 151 | Panorama from Top of Moving Train; Also known as Panorama from Top of a Moving Train | Panorama pris d'un train en marche (ponts et tunnels) | Survives |
| 152 | A Soldier's Tedious Duty | Corvée de quartier accidentée | Lost |
| 153 | The Magician (US); Black Magic (UK) | Le Magicien | Survives |
| 154 | A Soldier's French Leave | Sorti sans permission | Lost |
| 155 | The Famous Box Trick | Illusions fantasmagoriques | Survives |
| 156 | Pygmalion and Galatea | Pygmalion et Galathée | Survives |
| 157 | Shooting the Chutes | Montagnes russes nautiques | Lost |
| 158 | Damnation of Faust | Damnation de Faust | Lost |
| 159 | Adventures of William Tell | Guillaume Tell et le Clown | Survives |
| 160–162 | The Astronomer's Dream, or the Man in the Moon | La Lune à un mètre (1—l'observatoire; 2—la Lune; 3—Phœbé); Also known as L'Homme dans la Lune | Survives |
| 163 | West Point; Also known as Fresh Paint | Prenez garde à la peinture | Lost |
| 164 | The Cave of the Demons | La Caverne maudite | Lost |
| 165 | The Artist's Dream | Rêve d'artiste | Lost |
| 166 | The Painter's Studio | Atelier d'artiste (farce de modèles) | Lost |
| 167 | The Four Troublesome Heads | Un homme de têtes Also known as Un homme de tête | Survives |
| 168 | The Cripple Lady (US); The Triple Lady (UK) | Dédoublement cabalistique | Lost |
1898–1899 -
| 169 | Temptation of St. Anthony | Tentation de saint Antoine | Survives |
| 170 | The Beggar's Dream | Rêve du pauvre | Lost |
| 171 | A Dinner Under Difficulties | Salle à manger fantastique | Survives |
1899 -
| 172 | Fantastical Illusions | Création spontanée Also known as Illusions fantastiques | Lost |
| 173–174 | Funeral of Felix Faure | Funérailles de Félix Faure (1—char; 2—les troupes) | Lost |
| 175–176 | Robbing Cleopatra's Tomb | Le Sacrilège (1—l'attentat; 2—résurrection de Cléopâtre); Also known as Cléopâtre | Unknown (Note: Listed as lost by Malthête, but believed by Frazer to survive in a private collection.) |
| 177–178 | The Bridegroom's Dilemma | Le Coucher de la mariée ou Triste nuit de noces Advertised as a scène comique | Fragment? |
| 179 | A Political Duel | Duel politique | Lost |
| 180 | An Extraordinary Wrestling Match | Luttes extravagantes | Lost |
| 181 | The Wandering Minstrel | Richesse et Misère ou la Cigale et la Fourmi | Lost |
| 182 | The Sentry's Stratagem | L'Ours et la Sentinelle | Lost |
| 183 | An Up-to-Date Conjurer (US); An Up-to-Date Conjuror (UK); Also known as The Conjurer (English) and L'Impressionniste fin de siècle (French) | L'Illusionniste fin de siècle | Survives (Note: Two distinct versions, with different scenery, slightly different actions, and a different featured dancer, are known to survive.) |
| 184 | Murder Will Out | Le Spectre | Lost |
| 185–187 | The Devil in a Convent (US) "The Sign of the Cross", or the Devil in a Convent (UK) | Le Diable au couvent (1. Les nonnes, le sermon. 2. Les démons, le sabbat. 3. Le clergé, l'exorcisme) | Survives |
| 188 | Haggard's "She"—The Pillar of Fire | Danse du feu Also known as La colonne de feu | Survives |
| 189 | The Spanish Inquisition—Cremation | La Crémation (le supplice, le miracle) | Lost |
| 190 | A Midnight Episode | Un bon lit | Unknown |
| 191 | The Slippery Burglar | Force doit rester à la loi | Lost |
| 192 | A Drop Too Much | Pickpocket et Policeman | Lost |
| 193 | A Lively Cock-Fight (US); A Lively Cock Fight (UK) | Combat de coqs | Lost |
| 194–195 | The Clown and Automobile (US); The Clown and Motor Car (UK) | Automaboulisme et Autorité (scène comique clownesque) | Fragment |
| 196 | A Mysterious Portrait; Also known as The Mysterious Portrait | Le Portrait mystérieux (grande nouveauté photographique extraordinaire) | Survives |
| 197 | Absent-Minded Lecturer | Le Conférencier distrait | Lost |
| 198 | The Philosopher's Stone | La Pierre philosophale | Lost |
| 199 | Cagliostro's Mirror | Le Miroir de Cagliostro (miroir avec apparitions mystérieuses) | Lost |
| 200 | Neptune and Amphitrite | Neptune et Amphitrite (illusion mythologique sur mer) | Lost |
| 201 | Bird's-Eye View of St. Helier (Jersey) | Panorama du port de Saint-Hélier (île de Jersey) | Lost |
| 202 | Steamer Entering the Harbor of Jersey | Entrée du paquebot Victoria dans le port de Jersey | Lost |
| 203 | Passengers Landing at Harbor of Granville | Débarquement des voyageurs, port de Granville | Lost |
| 204 | Christ Walking on the Water | Le Christ marchant sur les flots (exécuté sur mer véritable) | Lost |
| 205 | Summoning the Spirits | Évocation spirite Advertised as a scène à transformations | Survives |
| 206 | Dreyfus Court Martial—Arrest of Dreyfus (US); Arrest of Dreyfus, 1894 (UK) | Dictée du bordereau (arrestation de Dreyfus) | Survives |
| 207 | Devil's Island—Within the palisade (US); Dreyfus at Devil's Island—Within the palisade (UK) | La Case de Dreyfus à l'île du Diable | Survives |
| 208 | Dreyfus Put in Irons (US); Dreyfus Put in Irons—Inside Cell at Devil's Island (UK) | Dreyfus mis aux fers (la double boucle) | Survives |
| 209 | Suicide of Colonel Henry | Suicide du colonel Henry | Survives |
| 210 | Landing of Dreyfus at Quiberon (US); Landing of Dreyfus from Devil's Island (UK) | Débarquement de Dreyfus à Quiberon | Survives |
| 211 | Dreyfus Meets His Wife at Rennes (US); Dreyfus in Prison of Rennes (UK) | Entrevue de Dreyfus et de sa femme (prison de Rennes) | Survives |
| 212 | The Attempt Against the Life of Maitre Labori (US); The Attempt Against Maitre Labori (UK) | Attentat contre M^{e} Labori | Survives |
| 213 | The Fight of Reporters at the Lycée (US); The Fight of Journalists at the Lycee (UK) | Suspension d'audience (bagarre entre journalistes) | Survives |
| 214–215 | The Court Martial at Rennes | Le Conseil de guerre en séance à Rennes | Survives |
| 216 | The Degradation of Dreyfus (US); The Degradation of Dreyfus in 1894 (UK) (Note: Numbered 217 in British catalogues) | La Dégradation | Survives |
| 217 | Dreyfus Leaving the Lycée for Jail (US); Officers and Dreyfus Leaving the Lycee (UK) (Note: Numbered 216 in British catalogues) | Dreyfus allant du lycée de Rennes à la prison | Survives |
| 218 | The Human Pyramid | La Pyramide de Triboulet; Advertised as a tableau sensationnel pour coloris | Survives |
| 219–224 | Cinderella | Cendrillon | Survives |
| 225 | The Snow Man | La Statue de neige Advertised as a scène comique | Lost |
| 226–227 | The Mysterious Knight | Le Chevalier mystère | Survives |
| 228–229 | The Lightning Change Artist (US); The Chameleon Man (UK) | L'Homme protée | Lost |
| 230–231 | The Interrupted Honeymoon | Charmant voyage de noces | Lost |
| 232 | Panorama of River Seine (Note: Films #232 and #233 were released as a single film, #232–233, in American catalogues.) | Panorama de la Seine (les travaux de l'exposition de 1900: le Vieux-Paris, rive droite) | Lost |
| 233 | Panorama of River Seine | Panorama de la Seine (les travaux de l'exposition de 1900: les palais en construction, rive gauche) | Lost |
1899–1900 -
| 234 | Addition and Subtraction | Tom Whisky ou l'Illusionniste toqué | Survives |
| 235 | The Railroad Pickpocket; May have been released in the UK as The Railway Pickpocket | Fatale Méprise (scène comique en wagon) | Lost |
| 236 | An Intruder Behind the Scenes | Un intrus dans une loge de figurantes | Lost |
| 237–240 | The Miracles of Brahmin (US); The Miracles of the Brahmin (UK) | Les Miracles du Brahmine | Survives |
1900 -
| 241 | Scullion's Joke on the Chef | Farces de marmitons | Lost |
| 242 | The Three Bacchants (US); The Three Bacchantes (UK) | Les Trois Bacchantes | Lost |
| 243 | The Cook's Revenge | La Vengeance du gâte-sauce | Survives |
| 244 | The Misfortunes of an Explorer | Les Infortunes d'un explorateur ou les Momies récalcitrantes | Survives |
| 245 | Paris Exposition, 1900—"La Porte Monumentale" | La Porte Monumentale | Unknown (Note: Listed as lost by Malthête, but believed by Frazer to survive in a private collection.) |
| 246 | Paris Exposition, 1900—Moving Panorama, 1 | Panorama mouvant pris du trottoir roulant (le Champ-de-Mars) | Unknown |
| 247 | Paris Exposition, 1900—Moving Panorama, 2 | Panorama mouvant pris du trottoir roulant (l'esplanade des Invalides) | Unknown |
| 248 | Paris Exposition, 1900—Moving Panorama, 3 | Panorama mouvant pris du trottoir roulant (la rue des Nations) | Unknown |
| 249 | Paris Exposition, 1900—Details Connected With the Moving Sidewalk | Détail du trottoir roulant | Unknown |
| 250 | Paris Exposition, 1900—The Moving Sidewalk | La Plate-forme roulante | Unknown |
| 251 | Paris Exposition, 1900—Panoramic View, taken while boating on the River Seine.—Army and Navy Pavilions | Vue panoramique prise en bateau sur la Seine (le pavillon des armées de Terre et de Mer) | Unknown |
| 252 | Paris Exposition, 1900—Panoramic View, taken while boating on the River Seine.—Foreign palaces | Vue panoramique faisant suite à la précédente (les palais étrangers) | Unknown |
| 253 | Paris Exposition, 1900—Panoramic View, taken while boating on the River Seine.—Old Paris | Vue panoramique prise en bateau sur la Seine (panorama général du Vieux Paris) | Unknown |
| 254 | Paris Exposition, 1900—The Avenue of the Champs Elysées.—Palaces of Fine Arts | Porte d'entrée de l'Exposition sur l'avenue des Champs-Élysées | Unknown |
| 255 | Paris Exposition, 1900—Panoramic View from the Electric Railway | Vue panoramique prise à l'avant du train électrique | Unknown |
| 256 | Paris Exposition, 1900—Panoramic Excursion Round the Champs Elysées | Panorama circulaire des Champs-Élysées (Palais des Beaux-Arts) | Unknown |
| 257 | Paris Exposition, 1900—Panoramic Circular Tour; "Les Invalides" | Panorama circulaire (les Invalides) | Unknown |
| 258 | Paris Exposition, 1900—Circular Panorama; Champ de Mars | Panorama circulaire (pris du centre du Champ-de-Mars) | Unknown |
| 259 | Paris Exposition, 1900—Trocadero | Panorama circulaire (pris du centre du jardin du Trocadéro) | Unknown |
| 260 | Paris Exposition, 1900—Iéna Bridge | Panorama circulaire de la Seine (pont d'Iéna) | Unknown |
| 261 | Paris Exposition, 1900—From the Trocadero | Panorama semi-circulaire (pris du sommet des tours du Trocadéro) | Unknown |
| 262–263 | The One Man Band | L'Homme-Orchestre | Survives |
| 264–275 | Joan of Arc | Jeanne d'Arc | Fragment |
| 276–278 | The Seven Capital Sins | Les Sept Péchés capitaux | Lost |
| 279 | The Tricky Prisoner | Le Prisonnier récalcitrant | Lost |
| 280 | Unknown title | | |
| 281–282 | The Rajah's Dream, or the Bewitched Wood | Le Rêve du Radjah ou la Forêt enchantée | Survives |
| 283 | The Two Blind Men | Les Deux Aveugles | Lost |
| 284 | The Artist and the Mannikin | L'Artiste et le Mannequin | Survives |
| 285–286 | The Wizard, the Prince and the Good Fairy (US); The Sorcerer, the Prince, and the Good Fairy (UK) | Le Sorcier, le Prince et le Bon Génie | Survives |
| 287 | Don't Move | Ne bougeons plus! | Lost |
| 288 | The Dangerous Lunatic | Le Fou assassin | Lost |
| 289–291 | The Magic Book | Le Livre magique | Survives |
| 292 | Thanking the Audience | Vue de remerciements au Public | Lost |
| 293 | The Up-to-Date Spiritualism | Spiritisme abracadabrant | Survives |
| 294 | The Triple Conjuror and the Living Head | L'Illusioniste double et la Tête vivante | Survives |
| 295–297 | The Miser's Dream of Gold (US); The Miser, or the Gold Country (UK) | Le Songe d'or de l'avare | Lost |
| 298–305 | The Christmas Dream | Rêve de Noël; Advertised as a féerie cinématographique à grand spectacle en 20 tableaux | Survives |
| 306 | Crying and Laughing | Gens qui pleurent et Gens qui rient | Unknown (Note: Listed as lost by Malthête, but believed by Frazer to survive in a private collection.) |
| 307–308 | Coppelia, the Animated Doll | Coppelia ou la Poupée animée | Lost |
| 309–310 | Fat and Lean Wrestling Match (US); The Wrestling Sextette (UK) | Nouvelles Luttes extravagantes | Survives |
| 311 | A Fantastical Meal | Le Repas fantastique | Survives |
| 312–313 | Going to Bed Under Difficulties (US); An Increasing Wardrobe (UK) | Le Déshabillage impossible | Survives |
| 314 | Eight Girls in a Barrel (US); The Danaid's Barrel (UK) | Le Tonneau des Danaïdes | Survives |
| 315 | The Man With Wheels in His Head (US); The Gouty Patient (UK) | Le Malade hydrophobe | Unknown (Note: The Méliès scholar John Frazer was unable to obtain a print, but speculated that a copy may survive in Belgrade.) |
| 316 | Practical Joke in a Bar Room (US); A Practical Joke in a Bar Room (UK) | Une mauvaise plaisanterie | Lost |
| 317 | The Doctor and the Monkey | Le Savant et le Chimpanzé | Survives |
| 318–319 | The Conjurer With Hundred Tricks (US); The Conjuror With a Hundred Tricks (UK) | L'Homme aux cent trucs | Lost |
| 320–321 | The Clown Versus Satan | Guguste et Belzébuth | Lost |
| 322 | How He Missed His Train | Le Réveil d'un monsieur pressé | Survives |
| 323–324 | Twentieth Century Surgery | La Chirurgie de l'avenir | Lost |
| 325–326 | What Is Home Without the Boarder | La Maison tranquille Advertised as a scène comique | Survives |
| 327 | China Versus Allied Powers (US); China Versus the Allied Nations (UK) | Le Congrès des Nations en Chine | Lost |
| 328 | The Balloonist's Mishap | Les Mésaventures d'un aéronaute | Lost |
| 329–331 | The Bewitched Dungeon | La Tour maudite Advertised with the subtitle Transformations | Lost |
| — | Untitled advertising films (Note: In addition to his other films, it was also around 1900 that Méliès produced 15–20 advertising films. Though they were not included in the Star Film catalogues, the products advertised are known to have included tortoiseshell combs, Bornibus mustard, Dewar's whiskey, Le Bock Orbec beer, Sirop de Picon, Veuve C. Brunot shoe polish, Robert baby food, and Vicat insecticide. Other products probably advertised by Méliès were Mystère corsets, Falières phosphate, Nestlé flour, Xour lotion, Moritz beer, Pilocarpine anti-balding tonic, Delion hats, Menier and Poulain chocolate, and Éclipse shoe polish.) | | Lost |
1900–1901 -
| 332–333 | The Brahmin and the Butterfly | La Chrysalide et le Papillon d'or Also known as Le Brahmane et le Papillon | Survives |
| 334 | The Triple-Headed Lady | Bouquet d'illusions | Survives |
| 335–336 | Dislocation Extraordinary; Also known as Extraordinary Illusions | Dislocation mystérieuse | Survives |
| 337–344 | Red Riding Hood | Le Petit Chaperon rouge Advertised as a pièce féerique à grand spectacle en 12 tableaux | Lost |
1901 -
| 345–347 | The Magician's Cavern (US); The Magician's Cavern/The House of Mystery (UK) | L'Antre des esprits | Survives |
| 348–349 | A Maiden's Paradise | Le Chimiste repopulateur | Lost |
| 350–351 | The Bachelor's Paradise | Chez la sorcière | Survives |
| 352–353 | The Temple of the Sun | Le Temple de la Magie | Lost |
| 354 | Painless Dentistry (US); Harmless Dentistry (UK) | Le Charlatan | Unknown |
| 355 | Fun in Court (US); Contempt of Court (UK) | Une noce au village | Lost |
| 356 | A Good Trick (US); The Fierce Charger and the Knight (UK) | Le Chevalier démontable et le Général Boum | Lost |
| 357–358 | Excelsior! (US); The Prince of Magicians (UK) | Excelsior! | Survives |
| 359 | Off to Bloomingdale Asylum (US); Off to Bedlam (UK) | L'Omnibus des toqués ou Blancs et Noirs; Also known as Échappés de Charenton | Survives |
| 360 | The Sacred Fountain | La Fontaine sacrée ou la Vengeance de Bouddha | Lost |
| 361–370 | Blue Beard | Barbe-Bleue | Survives |
| 371–372 | A Hat With Many Surprises (US); The Hat of Many Surprises (UK) | Le Chapeau à surprises | Survives |
| 373 | A Phrenological Burlesque (US); The Phrenologist and the Lively Skull (UK) | Phrénologie burlesque | Lost |
| 374–375 | The Dragon Fly | La Libellule | Lost |
| 376–378 | The Trials of a Schoolmaster | L'École infernale | Lost |
| 379–380 | The Dream of a Hindu Beggar | Le Rêve du paria (sujet artistique) | Lost |
| 381 | The Elastic Battalion | Le Bataillon élastique (cocasserie fantastique) | Lost |
| 382–383 | The Man With the Rubber Head (US); A Swelled Head (UK) | L'Homme à la tête en caoutchouc | Survives |
1901–1902 -
| 384–385 | The Devil and the Statue (US); The Gigantic Devil (UK) | Le Diable géant ou le Miracle de la Madone; Advertised as a grande nouveauté | Survives |
| 386 | The Dwarf and the Giant (US); The Long and Short of It (UK) | Nain et Géant | Survives |
| 387–389 | The Cabinet Trick of the Davenport Brothers (US); The Mysterious Cabinet (UK) | L'Armoire des frères Davenport | Lost |
1902 -
| 390 | Wine Cellar Burglars (US); The Burglars in the Wine Cellar (UK) | Les Piqueurs de fûts | Lost |
| 391 | The Colonel's Shower Bath (US); The Painter's Mishap in the Barracks (UK) | Douche du colonel | Survives |
| 392–393 | Prolific Magical Egg (US); The Egg in Black Art (UK) | L'Œuf du sorcier Also known as L'Oeuf Magique Prolifique | Survives |
| 394–396 | The Dancing Midget (US); Marvellous Egg Producing With Surprising Developments (UK) | La Danseuse microscopique | Survives |
| 397 | The Eruption of Mount Pelee (US); The Terrible Eruption of Mount Pelée and Destruction of St. Pierre, Martinique (UK) | Éruption volcanique à la Martinique | Survives |
| 398 | The Catastrophe of the Balloon "Le Pax" | Catastrophe du Ballon Le Pax | Lost |
| 399–411 | A Trip to the Moon (US); Trip to the Moon (UK) | Voyage dans la Lune | Survives |
| 412 | The Shadow-Girl (US); Twentieth Century Conjuring (UK) | La Clownesse fantôme | Survives |
| Urban (Note: Not sold through the Star Films catalogues; commissioned and distributed by (and produced with the collaboration of) Charles Urban of the Warwick Trading Company) | The Coronation of Edward VII | Le Sacre d'Édouard VII | Survives |
| 413–414 | The Treasures of Satan (US); The Devil's Money Bags (UK) | Les Trésors de Satan | Survives |
| 415–416 | The Human Fly | L'Homme-Mouche | Survives |
| 417–418 | Marvellous Suspension and Evolution (US); Marvellous Suspension and Evolutions (UK) | La Femme volante | Survives |
| 419 | An Impossible Balancing Feat (US); An Impossible Feat of Balancing (UK) | L'Équilibre impossible | Survives |
| 420–421 | Drunkard and Inventor (US); What Befell the Inventor's Visitor (UK) | Le Pochard et l'Inventeur | Lost |
| 422–425 | Up-to-Date Surgery (US); Sure Cure for Indigestion (UK) | Une indigestion Advertised as a scène comique; also known as Chirurgie fin de siècle | Survives |
| 426–429 | Gulliver's Travels Among the Lilliputians and the Giants (US); Gulliver's Travels—In the land of the Lilliputians and the Giants (UK) | Le Voyage de Gulliver à Lilliput et chez les Géants; Also known as Voyages de Gulliver | Survives |
| 430–443 | Robinson Crusoe | Les Aventures de Robinson Crusoé | Fragment |
1902–1903 -
| 444 | The Enchanted Basket | La Corbeille enchantée | Unknown (Note: Frazer saw this film at the Museum of Modern Art in the 1970s, but Malthête's 2008 filmography lists it as lost.) |
| 445–448 | The Marvellous Wreath (US); The Marvellous Hoop (UK) | La Guirlande merveilleuse | Survives |
| 449–450 | Beelzebub's Daughters (US); The Women of Fire (UK) | Les Filles du diable | Lost (Note: Frazer described what he thought to be a surviving fragment of this film, but it was in fact another Méliès film, The Firefall. In turn, the film Frazer labels The Firefall was a film by Ferdinand Zecca.) |
| 451–452 | Misfortune Never Comes Alone (US); Accidents Never Happen Singly (UK) | Un malheur n'arrive jamais seul | Survives |
1903 -
| 453–457 | The Cake Walk Infernal (US); The Infernal Cake Walk (UK) | Le Cake-Walk infernal | Survives |
| 458–459 | The Mysterious Box (US); The Shallow Trick Box (UK); Also known as The Shallow Box Trick | La Boîte à malice | Survives |
| 460–461 | The Queen's Musketeers (US); The Musketeers of the Queen (UK) | Les Mousquetaires de la reine | Lost |
| 462–464 | The Enchanted Well | Le Puits fantastique | Survives |
| 465–469 | The Inn Where No Man Rests (US); The Inn of "Good Rest" (UK) | L'Auberge du bon repos | Survives |
| 470–471 | The Drawing Lesson, or the Living Statue | La Statue animée Advertised as a scène Louis XV à trucs | Survives |
| 472 | The Mystical Flame | La Flamme merveilleuse | Survives |
| 473–475 | The Witch's Revenge (US); The Sorcerer's Revenge (UK) | Le Sorcier | Survives |
| 476 | The Oracle of Delphi | L'Oracle de Delphes | Survives |
| 477–478 | A Spiritualistic Photographer | Le Portrait spirite | Survives |
| 479–480 | The Melomaniac | Le Mélomane | Survives |
| 481–482 | The Monster | Le Monstre | Survives |
| 483–498 | Fairyland, or the Kingdom of the Fairies (US); The Wonders of the Deep, or Kingdom of the Fairies (UK); Also known as The Kingdom of the Fairies and The Kingdom of Fairies | Le Royaume des fées | Survives |
| 499–500 | The Infernal Caldron and the Phantasmal Vapors (US); The Infernal Cauldron (UK) | Le Chaudron infernal | Survives |
| 501–502 | The Apparition, or Mr. Jones' Comical Experience With a Ghost (US); The Ghost and the Candle (UK); Also known as Apparitions | Le Revenant | Survives |
| 503–505 | Jupiter's Thunderbolts, or the Home of the Muses; Also known as Jupiter's Thunderballs | Le Tonnerre de Jupiter | Survives |
| 506–507 | Ten Ladies in One Umbrella (US); Ten Girls in One Umbrella (UK); Also known as Ten Ladies in an Umbrella | La Parapluie fantastique | Survives |
| 508–509 | Jack Jaggs and Dum Dum (US); The Rival Music Hall Artistes (UK) | Tom Tight et Dum Dum | Survives |
| 510–511 | Bob Kick, the Mischievous Kid | Bob Kick, l'enfant terrible | Survives |
| 512–513 | Extraordinary Illusions (US); The 20th Century Illustrationist (UK) | Illusions funambulesques | Survives |
| 514–516 | Alcofrisbas, the Master Magician (US); The Enchanter (UK) | L'Enchanteur Alcofribas | Survives |
| 517–519 | Jack and Jim (US); Comical Conjuring (UK) | Jack et Jim | Survives |
| 520–524 | The Magic Lantern (US); The Magic Lantern, or the Bioscope in the Toy Shop (UK) | La Lanterne magique | Survives |
| 525–526 | The Ballet-Master's Dream (US); The Dream of the Ballet Master (UK) | Le Rêve du maître de ballet | Survives |
| 527–533 | The Damnation of Faust (US); The Condemnation of Faust (UK) | Faust aux enfers | Survives |
| 534–535 | The Terrible Turkish Executioner, or It Served Him Right (US); What Befell the Turkish Executioner (UK) | Le Bourreau turc | Survives |
| 536–537 | A Burlesque Highway Robbery in "Gay Paree" (US); The "Apaches"—Parisian hooligans (UK) | Les Apaches | Lost |
| 538–539 | A Moonlight Serenade, or the Miser Punished (US); Pierrot and the Moon (UK) | Au clair de la Lune ou Pierrot malheureux | Survives |
1904 -
| 540–541 | Tit for Tat, or a Good Joke With My Head (US) "Tit for Tat"—The head in a case (UK) | Un prêté pour un rendu (une bonne farce avec ma tête) | Survives |
| 542–544 | A Wager Between Two Magicians, or Jealous of Myself (US); A Juggling Contest Between Two Magicians (UK) | Match de prestidigitation | Survives |
| 545 | Every Man His Own Cigar Lighter | Un peu de feu, S.V.P. | Fragment |
| 546 | The Invisible Siva (US); The Invisible Sylvia [sic] (UK) | Siva l'invisible | Lost |
| 547–549 | The Bewitched Trunk (US); The Enchanted Trunk (UK) | Le Coffre enchanté (scène merveilleuse et comique) | Survives |
| 550–551 | The Fugitive Apparitions (US); Short Lived Apparitions (UK) | Les Apparitions fugitives | Survives |
| 552–553 | The Untamable Whiskers (US); The King of the Mackerel Fishers (UK) | Le Roi du maquillage | Survives |
| 554–555 | The Clockmaker's Dream (US); The Dream of the Clock Maker (UK) | Le Rêve de l'horloger | Survives |
| 556–557 | The Imperceptible Transmutations (US); Imperceptible Transformation (UK) | Les Transmutations imperceptibles | Survives |
| 558–559 | A Miracle Under the Inquisition (US); A Miracle of the Inquisition (UK) | Un miracle sous l'inquisition | Survives |
| 560–561 | Benvenuto Cellini, or A Curious Evasion (US); Benvenuto Cellini, or the Curious Elopement (UK) | Benvenuto Cellini ou Curieuse Évasion | Survives |
| 562–574 | Faust and Marguerite (US); Faust (UK) | Damnation du docteur Faust | Survives |
| 575–577 | The Fake Russian Prophet (US); The Merry Prophet of Russia (UK) | Le Joyeux Prophète russe (fantaisie russo-japonaise) | Lost |
| 578–580 | Tchin-Chao, the Chinese Conjurer (US); The Chinese Juggler (UK) | Le Thaumaturge chinois | Survives |
| 581–584 | The Wonderful Living Fan (US); The Wonderful Living Fan—Fine (UK) | Le Merveilleux Éventail vivant | Survives |
| 585–588 | The Cook in Trouble (US); Cookery Bewitched (UK) | Sorcellerie culinaire (scène clownesque) | Survives |
| 589–590 | The Devilish Plank (US); The Devil's Plank (UK) | La Planche du diable | Survives |
| 591–592 | The Impossible Dinner (US); The Impossible Dinner—Burlesque (UK) | Le Dîner impossible | Lost |
| 593–595 | The Mermaid | La Sirène | Survives |
| 596–597 | The Mischances of a Drunkard (US); The Drunkard's Mishaps (UK) | Les Mésaventures de M. Boit-sans-Soif | Survives |
| 598–602 | The Providence of the Waves, or the Dream of a Poor Fisherman (US); The Fisher's Guardian Angel (UK) | La Providence de Notre-Dame-des-Flots | Lost |
| 603–605 | Uncle Rube's Birthday (most comical and amusing) (US); Practical Joke on a Yokel (UK) | La Fête au père Mathieu | Lost |
| 606–625 | The Barber of Sevilla; Also known as The Barber of Sevilla, or the Useless Precaution and The Barber of Seville | Le Barbier de Séville | Lost |
| 626–627 | The Animated Costumes (US); Animated Costumes (UK) | Les Costumes animés | Lost |
| 628–631 | Simple Simon's Surprise Party (US); Bill Bailey's Dinner (UK) | Les Invités de M. Latourte; Also known as Une Bonne Surprise | Lost |
| 632–633 | The Astonishing Frame (US); The Magic Frame (UK) | Le Cadre aux surprises | Lost |
| 634–636 | The Wonderful Rose-Tree (US); The Magical Rose Tree (UK) | Le Rosier miraculeux | Survives |
| 637–638 | The Shadow Lady (US); The Enchanted Cupboard (UK) | La Dame fantôme | Lost |
| 639–640 | A Wedding by Correspondence (US); Marriage by Correspondence (UK) | Mariage par correspondance | Lost |
| 641–659 | An Impossible Voyage (US); Whirling the Worlds (UK); Also known as The Impossible Voyage | Voyage à travers l'impossible | Survives |
| 660–661 | Supplementary Section of the "Impossible Voyage" | Supplément Voyage à travers l'impossible | Unknown (Note: Frazer discovered and examined this film at the Academy of Motion Picture Arts and Sciences in the 1970s, but Malthête's 2008 filmography lists it as lost.) |
| 662–664 | The Wandering Jew | Le Juif errant | Survives |
| 665–667 | The Firefall (US); Cascade of Fire (UK) | La Cascade de feu | Survives |
| 668 | The Grotto of Surprises (US); Grotto of Surprises (UK) | La Grotte aux surprises | Lost |
| 669–677 | The Christmas Angel (US); The Beggar Maiden (UK) | Détresse et Charité; Also known as L'Ange de Noël | Survives |
1905 -
| 678–679 | The Living Playing Cards | Les Cartes vivantes | Survives |
| 680–682 | The King of Sharpshooters | Le Roi des tireurs | Lost |
| 683–685 | The Black Imp | Le Diable noir | Survives |
| 686–689 | The Crystal Casket; Also known as The Magic Dice | Le Phénix ou le Coffret de cristal | Fragment |
| 690–692 | The Lilliputian Minuet | Le Menuet lilliputien | Fragment |
| 693–695 | A Mesmerian Experiment | Le Baquet de Mesmer | Survives |
| 696–698 | Mr. Dauber and the Whimsical Picture | Le Peintre Barbouillard et le Tableau diabolique | Lost |
| 699–701 | The Venetian Looking-Glass | Le Miroir de Venise; Advertised as une mésaventure de Schylock | Lost |
| 702–704 | The Chloroform Fiends | Les Chevaliers du chloroforme Advertised as a scène burlesque | Lost |
| 705–726 | The Palace of the Arabian Nights | Le Palais des mille et une nuits | Survives |
| 727–731 | A Crazy Composer | Le Compositeur toqué | Survives |
| 732–737 | The Tower of London | Le Tour de Londres ou les Derniers Moments d'Anne de Boleyn | Lost |
| 738–739 | The Enchanted Sedan Chair | La Chaise à porteurs enchantée | Survives |
| 740–749 | An Adventurous Automobile Trip | Le Raid Paris–Monte-Carlo en automobile Also known as Le Raid Paris–Monte-Carlo en deux heures | Survives |
| 750–752 | The Mysterious Island | L'Île de Calypso; Advertised with the subtitle Ulysse et le géant Polyphème | Survives |
| 753–755 | Unexpected Fireworks | Un feu d'artifice improvisé | Survives |
| 756–775 | Rip's Dream | La Légende de Rip Van Vinckle [sic] | Survives |
| 776–779 | The Angler's Nightmare, or A Policeman's Troubles | Le Cauchemar du pêcheur ou l'Escarpolette fantastique | Lost |
| 780–783 | Life-Saving Up-to-Date | Le Système du docteur Souflamort | Lost |
| 784–785 | The Scheming Gambler's Paradise | Le Tripot clandestin | Survives |
| 786–788 | The Inventor Crazybrains and His Wonderful Airship (US); Fantastical Air Ship (UK) | Le Dirigeable fantastique ou le Cauchemar d'un inventeur | Survives |
1906 -
| 789–790 | A Mix-up in the Gallery | Une chute de cinq étages | Survives |
| 791–806 | Chimney Sweep | Jack le ramoneur | Fragment |
| 807–809 | Professor Do-mi-sol-do, the Luny Musician | Le Maestro Do-Mi-Sol-Do | Survives |
| 810–812 | Old and New Style Conjurers | La Magie à travers les âges | Lost |
| 813–817 | Who Looks, Pays! | L'Honneur est satisfait | Lost |
| 818–820 | The Tramp and the Mattress Makers | La Cardeuse de matelas | Survives |
| 821–823 | The Hilarious Posters | Les Affiches en goguette | Survives |
| 824–837 | A Desperate Crime | Les Incendiaires; Also known as Histoire d'un crime | Fragment |
| 838–839 | Punch and Judy | L'Anarchie chez Guignol | Fragment |
| 840–842 | A Spiritualist Meeting | Le Fantôme d'Alger | Lost |
| 843–845 | A Roadside Inn | L'Hôtel des voyageurs de commerce ou les Suites d'une bonne cuite | Survives |
| 846–848 | Soap Bubbles | Les Bulles de savon animées | Survives |
| 849–870 | The Merry Frolics of Satan | Les Quat'Cents Farces du diable | Survives |
| 871–873 | A Seaside Flirtation | Le Rastaquouère Rodriguez y Papaguanas | Lost |
| 874–876 | The Mysterious Retort (US); The Alchemist and the Demon (UK) | L'Alchimiste Parafaragaramus ou la Cornue infernale | Survives |
| 877–887 | The Witch | La Fée Carabosse ou le Poignard fatal Advertised as a grande légende fantastique bretonne en 20 tableaux | Survives |
| 888–905 | Robert Macaire and Bertrand | Robert Macaire et Bertrand, les rois de cambrioleurs | Survives |
| — (Note: Not sold in the Star Films catalogues; commissioned by Émile and Vincent Isola for use in a 1906 ballet-féerie titled Vers les étoiles) | No English release | Vers les étoiles | Lost |
1907 -
| 906–908 | A Mischievous Sketch | Le Carton fantastique | Lost |
| 909–911 | Rogues' Tricks (US); The Burglar's Bath (UK) | La Douche d'eau bouillante | Survives |
| 912–924 | Under the Seas | Deux Cents Milles sous les mers ou le Cauchemar du pêcheur Also known as Deux cent mille lieues sous les mers | Fragment |
| 925–928 | The Skipping Cheeses | Les Fromages automobiles | Survives |
| 929–935 | How Bridget's Lover Escaped | Le Mariage de Victorine; Also known as Le Mariage de Victoire | Survives |
| 936–950 | Tunneling the English Channel | Le Tunnel sous la Manche ou le Cauchemar anglo-français Also known as Le Tunnel sous la Manche ou le Cauchemar franco-anglais | Survives |
| 951–955 | A New Death Penalty | La Nouvelle Peine de mort | Lost |
| 956–960 | Drink! A Great Temperance Story | Le Delirium tremens ou la Fin d'un alcoolique | Lost |
| 961–968 | The Eclipse; Also known as The Eclipse, or the Courtship of the Sun and the Moon | Éclipse du Soleil en pleine Lune | Survives |
| 969–973 | The Bewildering Cabinet | Le Placard infernal | Lost |
| 974–979 | Chopin's Funeral March Burlesqued (US); Oh, That Band (UK) | La Marche funèbre de Chopin | Lost |
| 980–987 | Hamlet Prince of Denmark | Hamlet | Lost |
| 988–994 | A Forester Made King | Bernard le bûcheron ou le Miracle de saint Hubert | Lost |
| 995–999 | Shakespeare Writing "Julius Caesar" | La Mort de Jules César (Shakespeare) | Lost |
| 1000–1004 | Sightseeing Through Whisky | Pauvre John ou les Aventures d'un buveur de whisky | Survives |
| 1005–1009 | Good Glue Sticks | La Colle universelle | Survives |
| 1010–1013 | Satan in Prison | Satan en prison | Survives |
| 1014–1017 | Delirium in a Studio | Ali Barbouyou et Ali Bouf à l'huile | Survives |
| 1018–1022 | Bakers in Trouble | La Boulangerie modèle | Lost |
| 1023–1029 | An Angelic Servant (US); Jewel of a Servant (UK) | La Perle des servantes | Lost |
| 1030–1034 | The Knight of Black Art | Le Tambourin fantastique | Survives |
| 1035–1039 | In the Bogie Man's Cave | La Cuisine de l'ogre | Survives |
| 1040–1043 | The King and the Jester | François I^{er} et Triboulet | Survives |
| 1044–1049 | The Good Luck of a "Souse" | Il y a un dieu pour les ivrognes | Fragment |
1908 -
| 1050–1065 | Humanity Through Ages; Also known as Humanity Through the Ages | La Civilization à travers les âges | Lost |
| 1066–1068 | Justinian's Human Torches; Also known as Justinian's Human Torches 548 A.D. | Torches humaines | Survives |
| 1069–1072 | The Genii of Fire | Le Génie du feu | Survives |
| 1073–1080 | Why That Actor Was Late | No French release | Survives |
| 1081–1085 | The Dream of an Opium Fiend | Le Rêve d'un fumeur d'opium | Survives |
| 1086–1090 | A Night With Masqueraders in Paris | Nuit de carnaval | Lost |
| 1091–1095 | Long Distance Wireless Photography (US); Electrical Photographer (UK) | La Photographie électrique à distance | Survives |
| 1096–1101 | The Prophetess of Thebes | La Prophétesse de Thèbes | Fragment |
| 1102–1103 | In the Barber Shop | Salon de coiffure | Survives |
| 1104–1108 | A Mistaken Identity | Le Quiproquo; Advertised with the subtitle comique | Lost |
| 1109–1113 | A Lover's Hazing | Mariage de raison et Mariage d'amour | Lost |
| 1116–1123 | A Fake Diamond Swindler | L'Habit ne fait pas Lemoine ou Fabricant de diamants | Lost |
| 1124–1131 | Curiosity Punished | La Curiosité punié ou le Crime de la rue de Cherche-Midi à quatorze heures | Lost |
| 1132–1145 | No Trifling With Love; Also known as The New Lord of the Village | Le Nouveau Seigneur du village Advertised as a scène comique à spectacle; also known as On ne badine pas avec l'amour | Survives |
| 1146–1158 | The Miser | L'Avare | Fragment |
| 1159–1165 | Sideshow Wrestlers | Le Conseil du pipelet ou Un tour à la foire Advertised with the subtitle bouffonnerie extravagante | Survives |
| 1166–1172 | Pranks With a Fake Python | Le Serpent de la rue de la Lune | Lost |
| 1173–1175 | Up-to-Date Clothes Cleaning | High-Life Taylor (un complet modern style; originalité) | Lost |
| 1176–1185 | The Broken Violin | Lully ou le Violon brisé Advertised with the subtitle très artistique; spécial pour coloris; anecdote Louis XIV en 4 tableaux, avec ballet | Fragment |
| 1186–1189 | Hunting the Teddy Bear | Tartarin de Tarascon (une chasse à l'ours comique) | Lost |
| 1190 | The Little Peace Maker | Le Trait d'union Advertised as a gracieuse scène artistique avec apparition | Lost |
| 1191–1198 | A Love Tragedy in Spain | Rivalité d'amour | Lost |
| 1199–1217 | Mishaps of the New York–Paris Race | Le Raid New York–Paris en automobile | Lost |
| 1218–1226 | The Mystery of the Garrison | Sortie sans permission | Lost |
| 1227–1232 | The Woes of Roller Skaters; Also known as The Woes of Roller Skates | No French release | Survives |
| 1233–1237 | The Magic of Catchy Songs | No French release | Lost |
| 1238–1245 | The Forester's Remedy | No French release | Lost |
| 1246–1249 | Love and Molasses; Also known as His First Job | No French release Known as Amour et mélasse | Survives |
| 1250–1252 | The Mischances of a Photographer | No French release Known as Les Mésadventures d'un photographe | Survives |
| 1253–1257 | The Indian Sorcerer | Le Fakir de Singapour | Survives |
| 1258–1265 | Two Crazy Bugs | No French release | Lost |
| 1266–1268 | A Tricky Painter's Fate (US); A Railway Passenger's Ruse (UK) | No French release | Survives |
| 1269–1275 | The Hotel Mix-Up; Also known as At the Hotel Mix-Up | No French release | Lost |
| 1276–1282 | Oriental Black Art | No French release | Lost |
| 1283–1287 | Two Talented Vagabonds | Le Jugement du garde champêtre | Lost |
| 1288–1293 | French Interpreter Policeman; Also known as French Cops Learning English | No French release | Survives |
| 1294–1300 | Fun With the Bridal Party | Le Mariage de Thomas Poirot | Lost |
| 1301–1309 | Not Guilty | Anaïc ou le Balafré | Survives |
| 1310–1313 | Buncoed Stage Johnnie | Pour l'étoile S.V.P. | Fragment |
| 1314–1325 | A Grandmother's Story | Conte de la grand-mère et Rêve de l'enfant Also known as Au pays des Jouets | Fragment |
| 1326–1328 | The Helping Hand | Pour les p'tiots Also known as Le Main secourable | Lost |
| 1329–1336 | The Old Footlight Favorite | Trop vieux! | Lost |
| 1337–1346 | The Wonderful Charm (US); The Marvellous Fountain (UK) | La Fontaine merveilleuse | Lost |
| 1347–1352 | Honeymoon in a Balloon (US); The Ascension of a Communicant (UK) | L'Ascension de la rosière Also known as Voyage de noces en ballon | Lost |
| 1353–1366 | A Rude Awakening (US copyright title); The Duke's Good Joke (US release title) | Pochardiana ou le Rêveur éveillé | Lost |
| 1367–1371 | Incident from Don Quixote (US); Magic Armour (UK) | La Toile d'araignée merveilleuse Also known as Aventures de Don Quichotte | Lost |
| 1372–1385 | No English release Known as The Fairy Dragonfly | La Fée Libellule ou le Lac enchanté | Lost |
| 1386–1393 | No English release | Moitié de polka | Lost |
| 1394–1407 | The Fortune Favors the Brave; Also known as The Genii of the Bells | Le Génie des cloches ou le Fils du sonneur | Lost |
| 1408–1415 | Hypnotist's Revenge | No French release | Lost |
| 1416–1428 | No English release Known as Pharmaceutical Hallucinations | Hallucinations pharmaceutiques ou le Truc du potard | Survives |
| 1429–1441 | No English release Known as The Good Sheperdess and the Evil Princess | La Bonne Bergère et la Mauvaise Princesse | Fragment |
| 1442–1459 | The Living Doll | La Poupée vivante | Lost |
| 1460–1466 | Seein' Things | Fin de réveillon | Lost |
| 1467–1475 | Unknown title(s) | | Lost |
| — (Note: Catalogue number unknown) | No English release Known as The Frozen Policeman | L'Agent gelé | Survives |
| — | Tribulation or the Misfortunes of a Cobbler | No French release | Survives |
1909 -
| 1476–1485 | The Doctor's Secret | Hydrothérapie fantastique Also known as Le Secret du Médécin | Survives |
| 1486–1494 | Unknown title(s) | | Lost |
| 1495–1501 | The Fiendish Tenant; Also known as The Diabolic Tenant | Le Locataire diabolique | Survives |
| 1502–1507 | No English release | Un homme comme il faut | Lost |
| 1508–1512 | No English release Known as Whimsical Illusions | Les Illusions fantaisistes | Survives |
| 1513–1521 | If I Were King | Si j'étais roi!!! | Lost |
| 1522–1529 | No English release Known as King of the Mediums | Le Roi des médiums (apparitions fantômatiques) | Lost |
| 1530–1533 | The Spider and the Butterfly | Papillon fantastique | Fragment |
| 1534–1535 | No English release | La Gigue merveilleuse | Lost |
1910 -
No films (Note: In 1910, Méliès temporarily stopped production at his film studio in order to tour Europe with a stage magic spectacle, Les Fantômes du Nil.)
1911 -
| 1536–1547 | No English release Known as Baron Munchausen's Dream | Les Hallucinations du baron de Münchausen; Also known as Les Aventures de baron de Munchhausen | Survives |
| 1548–1556 | No English release Known as The Diabolical Church Window | Le Vitrail diabolique (magie vénitienne) | Fragment |
1912 -
| Pathé (Note: Made under the supervision of Pathé and distributed by that company) | No English release Known as The Conquest of the Pole | À la conquête du Pôle | Survives |
| Pathé | No English release Known as Cinderella or the Glass Slipper | Cendrillon ou la Pantoufle merveilleuse | Survives |
| Pathé | No English release Known as The Knight of the Snow and The Knight of the Snows | Le Chevalier des Neiges | Survives |
| — (Note: Supervised by Pathé, but the film was taken out of Méliès's control and was never released) | No English release Known as The Voyage of the Bourrichon Family | Le Voyage de la famille Bourrichon | Survives |

== Miscellaneous films ==
=== Later projects ===
Following the revival of interest in Méliès and his work in the late 1920s, he took part in several film projects:

- On 16 December 1929, a "Gala Méliès" was held at the Salle Pleyel in Paris in honor of the filmmaker. At the end of the program, after a screening of some of Méliès's films from the 1900s, a new film was projected, described by Méliès's granddaughter Madeleine Malthête-Méliès as follows:

Calling upon the method perfected by Méliès twenty-four years earlier … which allowed action to move from the screen to the stage … the Gala organizers asked him to shoot a very short film; we see him suddenly appear on the screen … Lost in the streets of Paris, he is looking everywhere for the Salle Pleyel … on the wall he sees an enormous Gala poster bearing his picture … He dives head first into the poster. Suddenly, the lights go on in the hall [where the film was projected]. The screen rises and uncovers, in the middle of the stage, a frame to which is nailed the poster we have just seen. Suddenly the paper rips apart and Méliès appears in the flesh.

- In 1933, Jean Aurenche and Jacques B. Brunius asked Méliès to make an advertising film for the Régie des Tabacs of France. Méliès's contribution, his final completed work as a film director, was a 28-second sequence featuring two uses of the stop substitution effect. It was reused in Brunius's 1939 film Violons d'Ingres.
- In the autumn of 1937, Méliès began work on a new film, Le Métro fantôme, with a scenario by Jacques Prévert. However, Méliès died on 21 January 1938 and the project was not completed.

=== Dubiously attributed films ===
The following films are listed without cited sources in the 1974 filmography by Paul Hammond and its revision by John Frazer, but not in the more complete 2008 filmography by Jacques Malthête. None of the following films have catalogue numbers, and all of them, if they existed to begin with, are presumed lost.

| English title | French title | Date | Length |
|---|---|---|---|
| No English title | Paulus chantant: Père la Victoire | 1897 | 20m/65 ft |
| No English title | Paulus chantant: En revenant d'la revue | 1897 | 20m/65 ft |
| Seek and Thou Shalt Find | No French title | January 1908 | 27m/88 ft |
| No English title | Le Traitment 706/Guérison de l'obésité en 5 minutes (Note: Not listed in Frazer's filmography) | September 1910 | 124m/390 ft |
| No English title | Le Mousquetaire de la Reine | 1910 | Unknown |
| No English title | Le Conte du vieux Talute | 1910 | Unknown |
| No English title | Les sept barres d'or | 1910 | Unknown |
| No English title | Galatée | 1910 | Unknown |
| No English title | L'Homme aux mille inventions | 1910 | Unknown |

=== Misattributed films ===
The following films by other directors have occasionally been erroneously credited to Méliès:

| Title | Year | Actual director | Studio |
|---|---|---|---|
| Magic Roses | 1906 | Segundo de Chomón | Pathé |
| The Red Spectre | 1907 | Segundo de Chomón | Pathé |
| Excursion to the Moon | 1908 | Segundo de Chomón | Pathé |
| Cinderella Up-to-Date | 1909 | Gaston Méliès | Star Film |
| The Count's Wooing | 1909 | Gaston Méliès | Star Film |
| For Sale—A Baby | 1909 | Gaston Méliès | Star Film |
| For the Cause of Suffrage | 1909 | Gaston Méliès | Star Film |
| Mr. and Mrs. Duff | 1909 | Gaston Méliès | Star Film |
| A Tumultuous Elopement | 1909 | Gaston Méliès | Star Film |
| Bessie's Ride | 1911 | Gaston Méliès | Star Film |
| Changing Cooks | 1911 | Gaston Méliès | Star Film |
| Mary's Stratagem | 1911 | Gaston Méliès | Star Film |
| Mexican As It Is Spoken | 1911 | Gaston Méliès | Star Film |
| The Mission Waif | 1911 | Gaston Méliès | Star Film |
| The Ranch Man's Debt of Honor | 1911 | Gaston Méliès | Star Film |
| Right or Wrong | 1911 | Gaston Méliès | Star Film |
| Red Cloud's Secret | 1911 | Gaston Méliès | Star Film |
| The Stolen Grey | 1911 | Gaston Méliès | Star Film |
| His Terrible Lesson | 1911 | Gaston Méliès | Star Film |
| Tommy's Rocking Horse | 1911 | Gaston Méliès | Star Film |
| The Ghost of Sulphur Mountain | 1912 | Gaston Méliès | Star Film |
| The Prisoner's Story | 1912 | Gaston Méliès | Star Film |

== Bibliography ==
- Frazer, John (1979), Artificially Arranged Scenes: The Films of Georges Méliès, Boston: G. K. Hall & Co., ISBN 0816183686
- Gaudreault, André (2011), "Theatricality, Narrativity, and Trickality: Reevaluating the Cinema of Georges Méliès", in Solomon, Matthew (ed.), Fantastic Voyages of the Cinematic Imagination: Georges Méliès's Trip to the Moon, Albany: State University of New York Press, pp. 31–47, ISBN 9781438435817
- Hammond, Paul (1974), Marvellous Méliès, London: Gordon Fraser, ISBN 0900406380
- Malthête, Jacques; Mannoni, Laurent (2008), L'oeuvre de Georges Méliès, Paris: Éditions de La Martinière, ISBN 9782732437323
- Solomon, Matthew (2011), "Introduction", in Solomon, Matthew (ed.), Fantastic Voyages of the Cinematic Imagination: Georges Méliès's Trip to the Moon, Albany: State University of New York Press, pp. 1–24, ISBN 9781438435817
