= Not guilty =

Not guilty may refer to:

- Not guilty plea, a plea by which a person charged with one or more criminal offenses denies committing them
- Acquittal, the legal result of a verdict of not guilty
- Not Guilty (1908 film), a French film
- Not Guilty (1910 film), an American film by the Thanhouser Company
- Not Guilty (1919 film), a British film
- Not Guilty (1921 film), an American film
- Not Guilty (1947 film), a French film
- "Not Guilty" (song), a song by George Harrison
