= A Tricky Painter's Fate =

1908 film by Georges Méliès

- Directed by: Georges Méliès
- Production company: Star Film Company
- Release date: 1908
- Country: France
- Language: Silent

A Tricky Painter's Fate, also known as A Railway Passenger's Ruse, is a 1908 French short silent film credited to Georges Méliès. The film features the actor Gallois as one of the train passengers. An analytical guide to Méliès's films, published by the Centre national de la cinématographie, concludes from the film's style that it was directed not by Méliès himself but by his assistant, an actor known as Manuel.

The film was sold by Méliès's Star Film Company and is numbered 1266–1268 in its catalogues; the title A Tricky Painter's Fate was used for the American market, and A Railway Passenger's Ruse for the British one. The film is not known to have been sold at the time in Méliès's native France. The film had reached as far afield as New Zealand by December 1908, when it is reported to have played in a program of "novelties" at the Wellington Town Hall.

Film scholar Lucy Fischer, in a study of René Magritte's art, calls attention to the way A Tricky Painter's Fate raises "questions of illusionism, and the muddle of real and fictional characters and spaces" in a way that recalls, and may have influenced, Magritte. The painter is known to have been a devotee of Méliès's work.
