= The Clown and Automobile =

Automaboulisme et Autorité
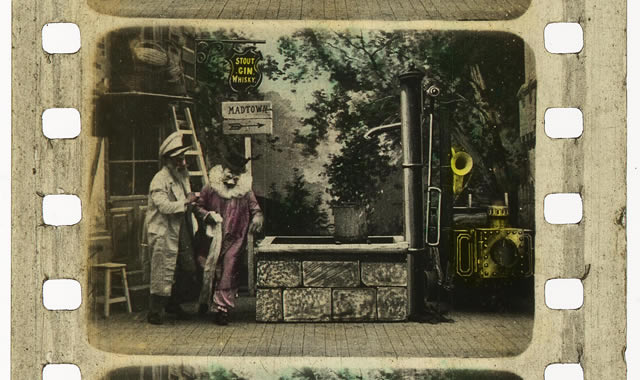
- A frame from the film
- Directed by: Georges Méliès
- Release date: 1899
- Running time: 40 meters/130 feet
- Country: France
- Language: Silent

Automaboulisme et Autorité (scène comique clownesque), released in the United States as The Clown and Automobile and in the United Kingdom as The Clown and Motor Car, is an 1899 French silent film directed by Georges Méliès. It was released by Méliès's Star Film Company and is numbered 194–195 in its catalogues.

The film was presumed lost until 2011, when a hand-colored fragment on nitrate film was found among a collection donated to the Cinémathèque Française.

== Summary ==
Though the print rediscovered in 2011 only comprises fragments of the original, Méliès's film catalogues provide a summary of the complete film:

[The film] shows the interior of a garden in which arrive two clowns on an automobile. After many pranks of a laughable character, which follow in rapid succession, they throw the waiter into the well, from which he is rescued with much difficulty and in a very dilapidated condition. In order to escape the consequences for this rough usage, they jump upon their automobile and endeavor to get away, but many obstructions are placed in their path. A film full of action and of a very humorous nature.

== Legacy ==
When writing about his childhood, the filmmaker Jean Renoir described a short silent film he saw as a child in 1902, featuring a clown called "Automaboul." The film made a vivid impression on Renoir, who said in 1938 that he "would give almost anything to see that program again. That was real cinema, much more than the adaptation of a novel by Georges Ohnet or a play by Victorien Sardou can ever be." The film scholar Alexander Sesonske has suggested that the film Renoir remembered was Méliès's Automaboulisme et Autorité.
