= The Mysterious Box =

1903 film by Georges Méliès

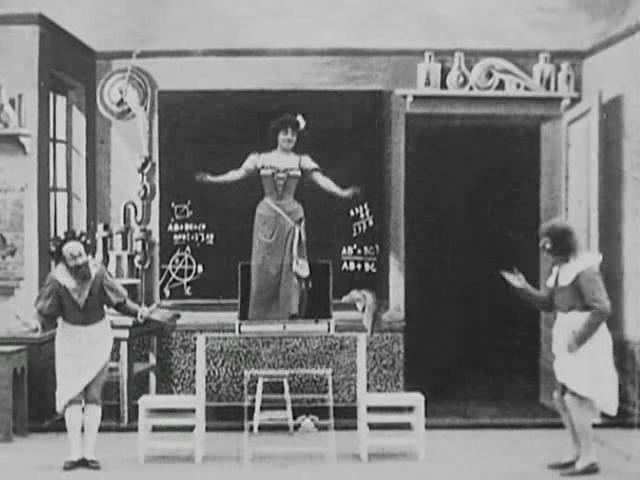
- A frame from the film
- Directed by: Georges Méliès
- Production company: Star Film Company
- Release date: 1903
- Country: France
- Language: Silent

La Boîte à malice, sold in the United States as The Mysterious Box and in Britain as The Shallow Trick Box, and also known as The Shallow Box Trick, is a 1903 French silent trick film by Georges Méliès. It was sold by Méliès's Star Film Company and is numbered 458–459 in its catalogues.

== Plot ==
The Mysterious Box (1903)

In a scientific laboratory, aided by an assistant in a worker's apron, a magician in Renaissance garb makes two chairs, a carpet, and a woman in peasant dress appear. The magician spreads two sheets of glass across the chairs, and puts an almost flat box on top of the glass. He escorts the lady into the box, which she vanishes into, despite it being far too shallow to hold her.

The magician, removing the glass setup, sits with his assistant, and shows that the lady is still inside the box. He then jumps into the box, the assistant follows, and the box rolls away of its own accord.

== Production ==
Méliès himself is the magician in the film, which uses substitution splices and multiple exposures to create its tricks.
