= Thanking the Audience =

- Directed by: Georges Méliès
- Production company: Star Film Company
- Release date: 1900
- Running time: 20 meters

Thanking the Audience (French: Vue de remerciements au Public) is a 1900 French short silent film directed by Georges Méliès. It was released by Méliès's Star Film Company and is numbered 292 in its catalogues.

The film was designed to be projected at the end of a showing of short films. It depicted seven international figures—"a Frenchman, English soldier, German, Spaniard, Italian lady, Russian, and Turkish lady"—transforming into each other, each displaying the words "Thanks, hope to see you again" in a different language.

Thanking the Audience is currently presumed lost.
