= The Broken Violin (1908 film) =

1908 film by Georges Méliès

- Surviving footage from The Broken Violin
- Directed by: Georges Méliès or Manuel
- Production company: Star Film Company
- Release date: 1908
- Country: France
- Language: Silent

The Broken Violin (French: Lully ou le Violon brisé) was a 1908 French short silent film by Georges Méliès. It was sold by Méliès's Star Film Company and is numbered 1176–1185 in its catalogues, where it was advertised as "très artistique; spécial pour coloris; anecdote Louis XIV en 4 tableaux, avec ballet" ("very artistic; filmed specifically for hand-coloring; an anecdote from the reign of Louis XIV in four scenes, with a ballet"). Only a fragment of the film is known to survive; the rest is presumed lost.

At least some of the film was shot outdoors, in the garden of the Méliès family property in Montreuil-sous-Bois. From an analysis of the surviving fragment, a guide to Méliès's films from the Centre national de la cinématographie concludes that the film was probably not directed by Méliès himself but by his employee, an actor known as Manuel.

The fragment shows a scene in a kitchen, where an assistant cook, the young Jean-Baptiste Lully, is berated for his tardiness. When alone, young Lully begins playing his violin, and the whole kitchen staff soon gather around him in delight at his playing. The joyful group is interrupted by a man in elaborate livery, who scolds Lully and sends him away. Another scene, of an elaborate room in Baroque style with a maidservant and an elegantly dressed lady, is briefly glimpsed at the end of the fragment.
