= The Misfortunes of an Explorer =

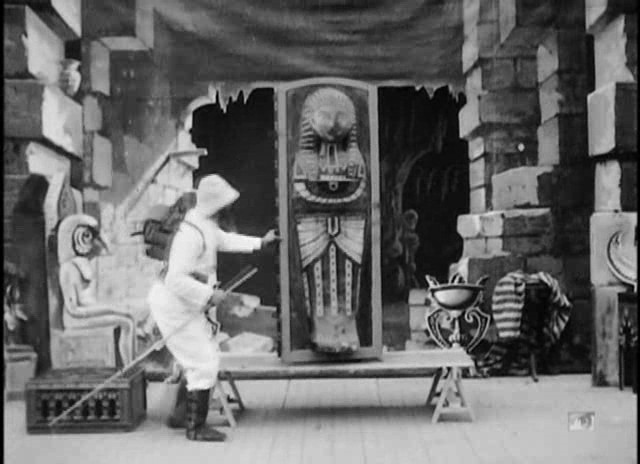
- A scene from the film
- Directed by: Georges Méliès
- Starring: Georges Méliès
- Production company: Star Film Company
- Release date: 1900
- Running time: Short
- Country: France
- Language: Silent

The Misfortunes of an Explorer (French: Les Infortunes d'un explorateur ou les momies récalcitrantes) is a 1900 French silent trick film by Georges Méliès.

== Plot ==
Entering an underground tomb, an English explorer comes across a sarcophagus. From it appears a ghost, which turns into a goddess angry at the explorer's infiltration. The goddess summons up three Ancient Egyptian monsters, which attack the explorer and trap him inside the sarcophagus, which the goddess magically sets on fire. She then stops the fire, and the explorer stumbles out and is chased away.

== Release ==
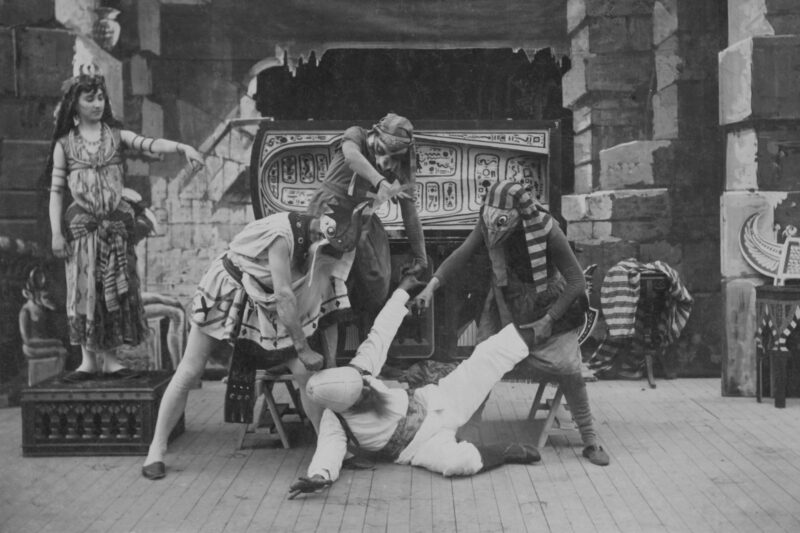
The monsters attack the explorer, under the supervision of the goddess, in a surviving film still

Méliès played the explorer in the film, which was released by his Star Film Company and numbered 244 in its catalogues.

A very brief fragment of the film (about 10 to 20 seconds, depending on frame rate) is known to exist, and has been released on home video and film festival prints. The fragment shows the explorer entering, discovering the sarcophagus, and stepping inside.
