= The Rescue on the River =

- Directed by: Georges Méliès
- Based on: Up the River by Robert W. Paul
- Produced by: Georges Méliès
- Production company: Star Film Company
- Release date: May 1896
- Country: France
- Language: Silent

The Rescue on the River (French: Sauvetage en rivière) was an 1896 French short silent film directed by Georges Méliès.

== Production ==
The film was probably made in May 1896. It was an imitation of Up the River, a short film made by the British film pioneer Robert W. Paul earlier in the same year. The Rescue on the River was Méliès's first experiment with longer forms of cinema: it told a story across two distinct shots, instead of the one-shot format he had used previously. In so doing, it marked a first step away from the brief Lumière-inspired scenes and actuality films with which Méliès had begun his filmmaking career, and toward the more complex films for which he would become known.

== Release ==
The Rescue on the River was released by Méliès's Star Film Company in two parts, numbered 22 and 23, respectively, in the company catalogues. Each part was approximately 20 meters (65 feet) long.

#	English title	French title
22	The Rescue on the River (1st part)	Sauvetage en rivière (1^{re} partie)
23	The Rescue on the River (2d part)	Sauvetage en rivière (2^{e} partie)

The Rescue on the River is currently presumed lost.
