= The Snow Man (film) =

- Directed by: Georges Méliès
- Starring: Georges Méliès
- Production company: Star Film Company
- Release date: 1899
- Country: France
- Language: Silent

The Snow Man (French: La Statue de neige) is an 1899 French short silent comedy film by Georges Méliès.

== Plot ==
Méliès appeared in the film as a policeman interacting with a snowman. Snowmen had been a popular feature in winter-themed stage entertainment in the decades preceding the film, and an actuality film depicting children making a snowman had appeared as far back as 1896.

== Release ==
The film was sold by Méliès's Star Film Company and is numbered 225 in its catalogues, where it was advertised as a scène comique (comic scene). Méliès burned the original camera negatives of his films late in life; The Snow Man is among the films currently presumed lost.
