= On the Roofs =

1897 film by Georges Méliès

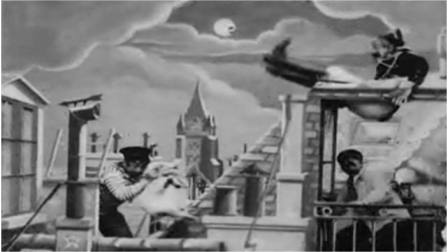
- A frame from the film
- Directed by: Georges Méliès
- Starring: Georges Méliès
- Release date: 1897
- Running time: 1min 11secs
- Country: France
- Language: Silent

On the Roofs (1897) by Georges Méliès

On the Roofs (French: Sur les toits (cambrioleurs et gendarmes)) is an 1897 French short silent comedy film directed by Georges Méliès. The film was released by Méliès's Star Film Company and is numbered 100 in its catalogues. The film features a bumbling policeman attempting to apprehend two criminals on the roof of an apartment building. "Every second of this," "highly successfully staged" "minute of film," according to Europa Film Treasues, "is used to construct the character's action and movements" and "made use of the theatre's three-dimensional decor," which "the competition quickly copied." The film was included in the Will Day collection bought by French Minister of Cultural Affairs André Malraux from collector Wilfrid Day in 1959 and preserved in the French Film Archives.

== Synopsis ==
A woman calls for help from her window as two burglars climb over the roofs into her house, tie her up, and throw her out of the window. A policeman hears her cries and climbs onto the roof, only to be trapped by the burglars before they make their escape.
