= Unexpected Fireworks =

1905 film by Georges Méliès

- Directed by: Georges Méliès
- Production company: Star Film Company
- Release date: 1905
- Country: France
- Language: Silent

Unexpected Fireworks (French: Un feu d'artifice improvisé) is a 1905 French short silent film by Georges Méliès. It was sold by Méliès's Star Film Company and is numbered 753–755 in its catalogues.

== Plot ==
An elderly, tattered drunkard stumbles down a street in front of a fireworks shop. He makes a chaotic pass at a passerby, who rebuffs him, and he collapses into a drunken stupor. A group of young troublemakers pass by, see the drunkard, and hatch a plan. Breaking through the doors of the fireworks shop, they surround the drunkard with pyrotechnic devices and let them start going off. The drunkard wakes up, bewildered by the fireworks, and begins running about before disappearing in a burst of smoke. The young troublemakers laugh at their prank.

== Production ==
The film began production after Méliès's son André Méliès, then four years old, told him about a dream he had had, in which practical jokers put fireworks around a sleeping drunkard. Méliès plays the drunkard in this film version of his son's dream, which uses pyrotechnics and substitution splices for its special effects.
