= The Scheming Gambler's Paradise =

1905 film by Georges Méliès

- Directed by: Georges Méliès
- Production company: Star Film Company
- Release date: 1905
- Country: France
- Language: Silent

The Scheming Gambler's Paradise (French: Le Tripot clandestin) is a 1905 French short silent film by Georges Méliès. It was sold by Méliès's Star Film Company and is numbered 784–785 in its catalogues.

== Plot ==
In an opulent room, a crowd is playing at a gambling table. Suddenly a servant rushes in to warn them that the police are about to raid their gambling den. In a few moments, in a flurry of moving panels, the gamblers disguise the whole room as a millinery, with the women posing as hat makers and the men hiding just outside. The raiding police come in, are astonished to find no gambling den, and apologize profusely for disturbing the "milliners".

As soon as the police leave, the room is changed back into a gambling den and the games resume. All is going well when the servant rushes in to announce a much bigger raid. This time, there is no time to transform the room, so the gamblers simply rush out, leaving one of them to turn out the light in the chandelier. He drops on the floor to hide, and a crowd of policemen and soldiers hurry into the darkened room, most of them tripping over the gambler before he can rush out.

The policemen and soldiers, tumbling over each other on the floor, untangle themselves when their leader lights the chandelier. After stern instructions from their leader, the whole force rushes to the gambling table and begins their own chaotic game. Hidden behind the room's trick panels, the scheming gamblers watch the policemen enjoy themselves.

== Production ==
The film is marked by a subversive touch, with the characters who represent order themselves giving into chaos. The room transformation is done with stage machinery, augmented by substitution splices; the effect of turning the chandelier off and on was worked using shutters, which blocked light from coming through the studio's glass roof.

A print of the film survives, although some footage is missing at the end.
