= Addition and Subtraction =

- Directed by: Georges Méliès
- Release date: 1900
- Running time: Short
- Country: France
- Language: Silent film

Addition and Subtraction (French: Tom Whisky ou L'illusioniste toqué) is a 1900 French silent trick film directed by Georges Méliès. It was released by Méliès' Star Film Company and is numbered 234 in its catalogues.

== Plot ==
The film features a magician, Tom Whisky (played by Méliès). The magician sits on the chair that he produced while dancing and a woman appears from the three chairs after each seating (the scene is created using substitution splices), with three women produced in total after consecutive performances. The magician then combines the three women into one large woman, then later "subtracts" a bit to produce a small boy. The magician then adds a bit to make the fat person appear in front of the audience. In the final scene of his performance he splits the fat person to produce the three ladies.

== Cast ==
Méliès plays the magician in the film. The other actors in the film have not been positively identified, but the film historian Georges Sadoul, analyzing a production still in which the film's three women are posed in a group, believed Jeanne Mareyla to be the woman in the center.
