= The Shadow-Girl =

1902 film by Georges Méliès

The Shadow-Girl (1902)

La Clownesse fantôme, released in the United States as The Shadow-Girl and in the United Kingdom as Twentieth Century Conjuring, is a 1902 French silent trick film directed by Georges Méliès.

== Survival ==
The film was presumed lost until the 1990s, when it was identified among a collection of early silent films rediscovered in Sulphur Springs, Texas, in 1993. This surviving fragment, about half the length of the complete film, premiered at the Pordenone Silent Film Festival in 1997.
