= A Wager Between Two Magicians, or Jealous of Myself =

A Wager Between Two Magicians, or Jealous of Myself / A Juggling Contest Between Two Magicians
- Directed by: Georges Méliès
- Starring: Georges Méliès
- Production company: Star Film Company
- Release date: 13 February 1904 (USA)
- Running time: 60 meters (approx. 2 minutes)
- Country: France
- Language: Silent

Match de prestidigitation (literally "conjuring contest"), released in the United States as A Wager Between Two Magicians, or Jealous of Myself, and in the United Kingdom as A Juggling Contest Between Two Magicians, is a 1904 French silent trick film directed by French film pioneer Georges Méliès.

The film was a lost film until partially rediscovered in 2016.

== Plot ==
A performing magician divides into two people. The doubles then take turns doing tricks before merging back into one man.

== Cast ==
Méliès himself plays the magician in the film.

== Release and rediscovery ==
A Wager Between Two Magicians was released by Méliès's Star Film Company and is numbered 542–544 in its catalogues. It was assumed lost until 2016, when a reel containing the final two thirds of the film was discovered at the Czech Film Archive.
