= King of the Mediums =

1910 film by Georges Méliès

- Directed by: Georges Méliès
- Starring: Georges Méliès
- Production company: Star Film Company
- Release date: 1909
- Country: France
- Language: Silent

Le Roi des médiums, also known as Apparitions fantômatiques and known in English as King of the Mediums, was a 1909 French short silent film by Georges Méliès.

Méliès played a magician in the film. It was sold by Méliès's Star Film Company and is numbered 1522-1529 in its catalogues, where it was advertised with the descriptive subtitle apparitions fantômatiques (ghostly apparitions). The film has sometimes been referred to by this subtitle.

No English-language release is known for this film, but the translated title King of the Mediums has been used in film reference. The film is currently presumed lost.
