= The Barber and the Farmer =

- Directed by: Georges Méliès
- Production company: Star Film Company
- Release date: 1897
- Country: France
- Language: Silent

The Barber and the Farmer (French: Figaro et l'Auvergnat) is an 1897 French short silent film by Georges Méliès. It was sold by Méliès's Star Film Company and is numbered 121 in its catalogues.

Long presumed lost, a single deteriorated copy of the film was discovered in the late twentieth century, near Paris. The film reel had congealed to the point where the images were stuck together, and two attempts to restore it to a viewable state using chemicals failed. In 2006, the French restoration studio Lobster Films collaborated with a London film laboratory on a restoration incorporating digital techniques. The restoration premiered that year at the Pordenone Silent Film Festival.
