= The Magician's Cavern =

L'Antre des espirits
- Directed by: Georges Méliès
- Release date: 1901
- Running time: 2min 50secs
- Country: France
- Language: Silent

L'Antre des esprits, released in the United States as The Magician's Cavern and in the United Kingdom as The House of Mystery, is a 1901 French silent comedy trick film, directed by Georges Méliès. It is listed as numbers 345–347 in Star Film Company's catalogues.

== Synopsis ==
The Magician's Cavern (1901)

A man enters his "cavern," and uses a human skeleton to do magic tricks. He first turns the skeleton into a scantily-clad woman carrying a shield. He then transforms her into a well-dressed lady, whom he makes levitate. The magician proceeds to turn the woman back into a skeleton, and make the body dance. He dances with the skeleton, then takes it off screen. He then uses magic to move a table around the room, then levitates a stool, resting it upon the table.

The magician continues his show, attempting to catch four dancing spirits on his stage. He proceeds to make more furniture dance, before casting it all aside and flying through the ceiling. The man reappears, then tears off his clothes to reveal a fancy suit, before lighting a smoke and exiting the stage.
