= A Love Tragedy in Spain =

- Directed by: Georges Méliès
- Release date: June 2, 1908
- Running time: 605 feet (approx. 8.5 minutes)
- Country: France
- Language: Silent

A Love Tragedy in Spain (French: Rivalité d'amour) is a 1908 French short silent film directed by Georges Méliès.

== Plot ==
Production stills

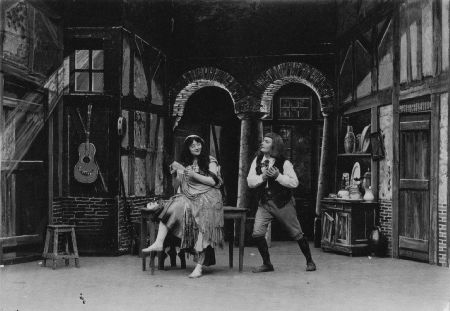
The dancer is courted

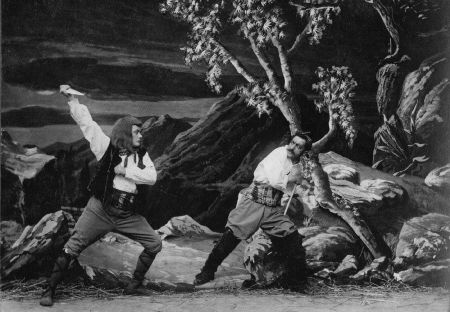
The fight in the mountains

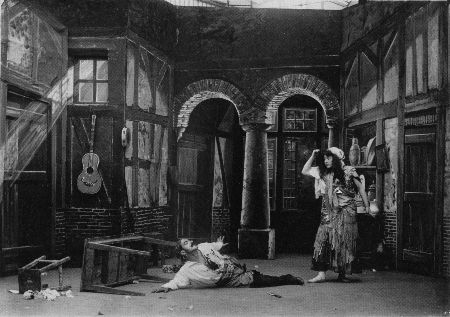
The smuggler's suicide

A Spanish dancer, in front of an inn in the Spanish mountains, is courted by a smuggler, who asks her to marry him. She agrees. Later, in the dancer's room, another man enters and declares his love for her. The smuggler, entering unnoticed, hears the declaration of love, and a violent argument breaks out between the two rivals for the dancer's affection. The suitors travel to a remote spot in the mountains and fight to the death; the smuggler wins the fight when the other suitor falls over a precipice. Returning to the dancer's room, the smuggler comes to meet his beloved, but the dancer refuses him when she finds out he killed his rival. The smuggler stabs himself in despair. The dancer, running to his corpse, touches his hands, and is repulsed to find them covered with blood.

== Release ==
The film was released by Méliès's Star Film Company and is numbered 1191–1198 in its catalogues, where it was advertised as a grande scène dramatique catalane. A synopsis in The Motion Picture World described the film as "a thrilling episode in the style of Bizet's Carmen."

A Love Tragedy in Spain is currently presumed lost.
