= The Artist and the Mannikin =

- Directed by: Georges Méliès
- Starring: Georges Méliès
- Production company: Star Film Company
- Release date: 1900
- Country: France
- Language: Silent

The Artist and the Mannikin (French: L'Artiste et le Mannequin) is a 1900 French short silent film by Georges Méliès.

== Plot ==
An artist puts a mannequin on a platform, to use as a model for his painting. Meanwhile, his manservant and a woman visitor conspire to pull a prank on the artist. The woman switches places with the mannequin and hits the artist with a broom. The artist, realizing the deception, attempts to hit her back, but she has already changed places again with the mannequin. The manservant laughs at the success of the woman's prank.

== Release ==
Méliès plays the artist in the film, which was sold by his Star Film Company and is numbered 284 in its catalogues.

Méliès burned all the surviving original camera negatives of his films toward the end of his life, and about three-fifths of his output is presumed lost. The Artist and the Mannikin was among the lost films until 2007, when a copy was identified and restored by the Filmoteca de Catalunya.
