= The Duke's Good Joke =

- Directed by: Georges Méliès
- Starring: Georges Méliès
- Production company: Star Film Company
- Release date: October 1908 (US)
- Running time: 930 feet (approx. 14 min.)
- Country: France
- Language: Silent

Pochardiana ou le Rêveur éveillé (literally "Drunkenness, or the Awake Dreamer"), known in English as A Rude Awakening and as The Duke's Good Joke, is a 1908 French short silent film by Georges Méliès.

== Plot ==
A mischievous duke comes across a drunkard in a town square, and decides to pull a practical joke. He has the drunkard carried to the ducal palace and dressed as a nobleman, where he is made to receive courtiers. A banquet is prepared for the fake nobleman, who is too far gone to understand the situation, and unusual things seem to begin occurring. When the drunkard attempts to get more to drink, the bottle magically grows to giant size and disappears, so the duke's servants bring in a large funnel and fill the drunkard up, with his stomach swelling up like a balloon to fit. The duke's doctors work to deflate him back to normal. The drunkard tries to get some sleep, but the paintings on the walls come to life, showing him all sorts of scenes of people drinking merrily. The duke decides to end the joke, and puts the drunkard back in the town square.

== Release ==
Surviving film stills reveal that Méliès played the prank victim in the film, which was sold by his Star Film Company and is numbered 1353–1366 in its catalogues. In the United States, it appears to have been registered for copyright at the Library of Congress on 10 October 1908, under the title A Rude Awakening; however, the film was advertised and sold in American markets under the title The Duke's Good Joke.

The trade periodical The Moving Picture World commented in a brief notice: "Méliès' films can always be counted upon to please a certain element of the audience, and especially the children, who become spellbound by the magic and clever effects produced by this master of trick photography. This feature is not lacking in The Duke's Good Joke."

The film is currently presumed lost.
