= The School for Sons-in-law =

- Directed by: Georges Méliès
- Based on: L'École des gendres by Eugène Bertol-Graivil
- Production company: Star Film Company
- Release date: 1897
- Country: France
- Language: Silent

The School for Sons-in-law (French: L'École des gendres) is an 1897 French short silent film by Georges Méliès. It was inspired by a vaudeville (in the sense of a light stage comedy) by Eugène Bertol-Graivil, a French playwright whose real name was Eugène Domicent (1857–1910).

The School for Sons-in-law was filmed outdoors in the garden of the Méliès family property in Montreuil-sous-Bois, with painted scenery; many parts of the set were reused in other films. It was sold by Méliès's Star Film Company and is numbered 102 in its catalogues, but is currently presumed lost.
