= Crying and Laughing =

- Directed by: Georges Méliès
- Production company: Star Film Company
- Release date: 1900
- Running time: 20 meters (approx. 1 min.)
- Country: France
- Language: Silent

Crying and Laughing (French: Gens qui pleurent et Gens qui rient) is a 1900 French short silent film by Georges Méliès. It was sold by Méliès's Star Film Company and is numbered 306 in its catalogues.

The survival status of the film is unclear. In a 1979 book, John Frazer reported that he had seen the film in a private collection; it was a one-minute medium shot of two people together, one crying, one laughing manically. However, Jacques Malthête's 2008 filmography of Méliès's work lists the film as lost. In 2020, the film festival Il Cinema Ritrovato featured a one-minute film from the archives of the Centre national du cinéma, listing the film as Gens qui pleurent, gens qui rient and suggesting that it may be Méliès's film; the attribution is to "[Georges Méliès?]", with a question mark.
