= The Miracles of the Brahmin =

- Directed by: Georges Méliès
- Based on: "Les Miracles du Brahmine" (stage act by Georges Méliès)
- Starring: Georges Méliès; Jeanne Mareyla
- Production company: Star Film Company
- Release date: 1900
- Country: France
- Language: Silent

Les Miracles du Brahmine, sold in the United States as The Miracles of Brahmin and in Britain as The Miracles of the Brahmin, is a 1900 French silent trick film by Georges Méliès. It was sold by Méliès's Star Film Company and is numbered 237–240 in its catalogues.

The film is derived from a magic act Méliès created and performed at his Paris stage venue, the Théâtre Robert-Houdin. Méliès appears in the film as the brahmin of the title; according to film historian Georges Sadoul, Jeanne Mareyla plays the woman in the center of the group of three. A print of the film survives, and was shown at the film festival Il Cinema Ritrovato in 2020.
