= A Seaside Flirtation =

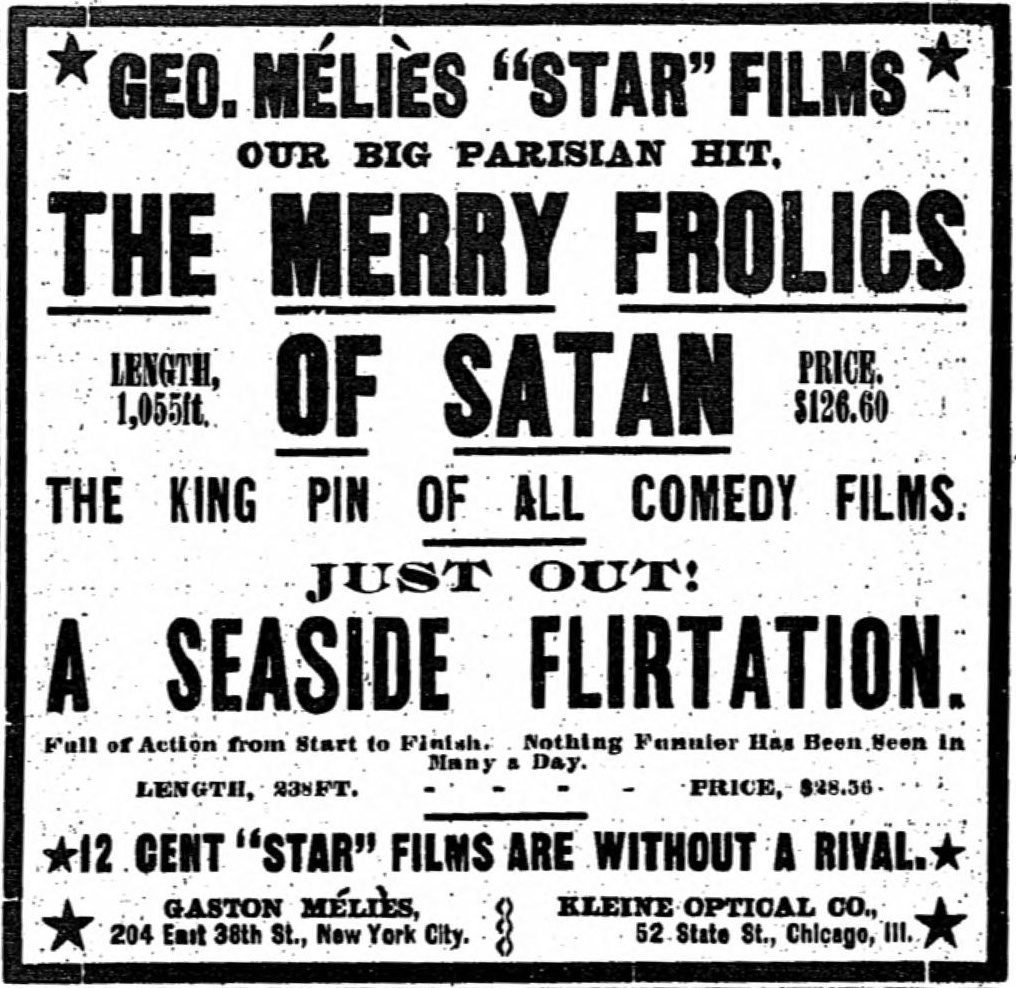
- Newspaper advertisement for The Merry Frolics of Satan and A Seaside Flirtation
- Directed by: Georges Méliès
- Production company: Star Film Company
- Release date: November 1906 (USA)
- Running time: 72 meters/238 feet Approx. 4.5 minutes (14 fps)
- Country: France
- Language: Silent

A Seaside Flirtation (French: Le Rastaquouère Rodriguez y Papaguanas) is a 1906 French silent comedy film directed by Georges Méliès.

== Plot ==
On the beach, a young woman enters a bathing box to change from her bathing costume to her street clothes. A young dandy, attempting to flirt with the woman, stops at a seaside restaurant near the bathing box to write her an amorous note. The woman, seeing him writing, quickly changes places with her husband in a neighboring bathing box. The dandy, stooping down to slip his note under the door, is taken by surprise when the husband pours a pitcher of water on him. The astonished dandy knocks over the bathing box. It falls on some diners at the restaurant, who angrily shove the dandy inside the box, pile it in chairs and tables, lift it high in the air, and give the dandy a shake. The restaurant's chef finishes off the exhausted dandy's punishment by pouring a bag of flour over him. The young woman, having changed into her street clothes, leaves her husband's bathing box and joins in the general mocking of the attempted seaside flirtation.

== Release and reception ==
The film was released by Méliès's Star Film Company and is numbered 871–873 in its catalogs. In America, the 24 November 1906 issue of The New York Clipper mentioned A Seaside Flirtation and The Merry Frolics of Satan as the latest imports from Méliès's studio.

A 1907 item in The Moving Picture World, reporting on a Chicago judge who claimed nickelodeons were connected with juvenile delinquency, included A Seaside Flirtation in a list of risqué films shown that weekend in Chicago. Noting the suggestive titles, the anonymous reporter commented: "One is willing to admit that the effect may be somewhat different from that of the Sunday school... Surely [such films are] not just the kind of selection the average parent would make for his or her little ones, were the matter of selecting the films left to the parents."

A Seaside Flirtation is currently presumed lost.
