= The Living Doll =

1908 film by Georges Méliès

- Directed by: Georges Méliès
- Production company: Star Film Company
- Release dates: December 1908 (France); 15 December 1909 (USA)
- Country: France
- Language: Silent

The Living Doll (French: La Poupée vivante) is a 1908 French short silent Christmas film by Georges Méliès. The film, combining American ideas about Santa Claus with Méliès's fantasy style and a modern touch, followed the adventures of a young girl, Polly, one Christmas night, as she escapes kidnappers, travels to Santa's palace, and—by changing places with a large doll—goes with Santa on a giftgiving journey by airplane.

The film was released in its native France in late December 1908; for American release, it was held off until the Christmas season the following year. It is now presumed lost.

== Plot ==
On Christmas Eve, a young girl, Polly, is excited to find out what Santa Claus will bring her during the night. As soon as she falls asleep, a pair of kidnappers arrive and carry Polly away. Escaping them, she becomes lost in a snowy forest. She climbs a tree and sees a far-off church lit up for Midnight Mass. Arriving at the church, Polly admires a stained glass window. Magically it spins and disappears to reveal visions of Santa, children finding Christmas presents, and angels bestowing blessings. Leaving the church, Polly finds the way to Santa's palace.

In the palace, where angels are loading an airplane full of toys for Santa to deliver, Polly finds an enormous box holding a doll as large as she is. Polly puts on the doll's clothes and takes its place in the box, which is loaded into the airplane and sets off. Polly's box is dropped down a chimney and into her own house. Polly wakes up to realise her whole adventure had been a dream—but the giant doll she had imagined is there among her gifts, waiting for her. A final scene shows Polly and Santa Claus together: he is bestowing gifts and she is blowing kisses goodbye.

== Release ==
The Living Doll was released by Méliès's Star Film Company and is numbered 1442–1459 in its catalogues. The film was advertised in the French Ciné-Journal on 24 December 1908. It was released on 15 December 1909 in the United States, where it was advertised as a "Christmas spectacle". It was the last of Méliès's films to be registered for American copyright at the Library of Congress. A promotional blurb in The Moving Picture World described the film as "a Christmas picture story that combines American sentiment and ideas with the magic art of the French producer", promising it would entertain children and adults alike, and highlighting the modern touch of a Santa Claus traveling by airplane instead of by a sleigh pulled by flying reindeer. The film is currently presumed lost.
