= Excelsior! =

- Directed by: Georges Méliès
- Release date: 1901
- Country: France
- Language: Silent

Excelsior!, released in the United Kingdom as The Prince of Magicians, is a 1901 French silent comedy trick film, directed by Georges Méliès. It is listed as numbers 357–358 in Star Film Company's catalogues.

== Synopsis ==
A magician pulls a handkerchief from the mouth of his assistant. From the handkerchief, he pulls a large aquarium, and uses the arms of his assistant as a pump to fill it. The magician then pulls fish from his mouth to fill the tank.
