= A Dinner Under Difficulties =

- Directed by: Georges Méliès
- Production company: Star Film Company
- Release date: 1899
- Country: France
- Language: Silent

A Dinner Under Difficulties (French: Salle à manger fantastique) is an 1899 French silent trick film by Georges Méliès. It was sold by Méliès's Star Film Company and is numbered 171 in its catalogues. The film is a simple sketch in which a man accidentally knocks over his dining table, sending his meal to the floor. The problem is solved when, by magic, the table and its contents fly in backward motion back into place.

The film features Méliès's first known use of reverse motion, a special effect probably created by cranking the camera backward. Prints of A Dinner Under Difficulties survive at the British Film Institute and the George Eastman Museum.
