= The Two Blind Men =

- Directed by: Georges Méliès
- Starring: Georges Méliès
- Production company: Star Film Company
- Release date: 1900
- Running time: Short
- Country: France
- Language: Silent

The Two Blind Men (French: Les Deux Aveugles) is a 1900 French short silent film by Georges Méliès. It was sold by Méliès's Star Film Company and is numbered 283 in its catalogues.

The film is currently presumed lost. However, a film still does survive of one scene, with Méliès standing second from right, playing one of the characters.
