= The Fairy Dragonfly =

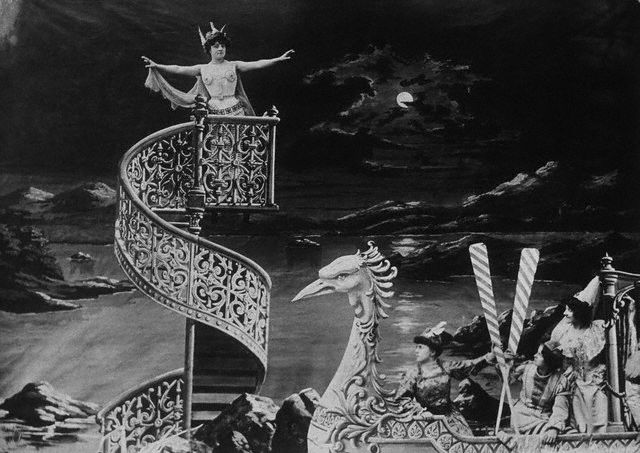
- Production still from the film
- Directed by: Georges Méliès
- Production company: Star Film Company
- Release date: 1908
- Country: France
- Language: Silent

The Fairy Dragonfly (French: La Fée Libellule ou le Lac enchanté) was a 1908 French short silent film by Georges Méliès. It was sold by Méliès's Star Film Company and is numbered 1372–1385 in its catalogues.

Little information is extant for this film, which is presumed lost. A few film stills survive, which have often been mistakenly attributed to an earlier Méliès film, The Kingdom of the Fairies. No English-language release is known for this film, but the translated title The Fairy Dragonfly has been used in film reference.
