= Incident from Don Quixote =

- Directed by: Georges Méliès
- Based on: Don Quixote by Miguel de Cervantes
- Production company: Star Film Company
- Release date: October 1908
- Running time: 355 feet (approx. 5.5 minutes)
- Country: France
- Language: Silent

La Toile d'araignée merveilleuse, released in the United States as Incident from Don Quixote and in Britain as Magic Armour, and also known as The Marvelous Cobweb and as Aventures de Don Quichotte, is a 1908 French short silent film directed by Georges Méliès, inspired by Miguel de Cervantes's Don Quixote.

The film depicts a dreaming Don Quixote who fights monsters in his sleep. He approaches a female winged humanoid, but the woman's wings turn into tentacles which attack the knight. The film features a typical depiction of a tentacle monster.

== Plot ==
In one of his dreams, Don Quixote is fighting monsters. Having vanquished them, he goes to put on his armor, only to be met with a succession of strange events: first the armor appears occupied by a creature with stretching limbs, then a lovely young woman appears and sprouts butterfly wings. As Quixote approaches her, the wings become giant tentacles and attack him. Just as Quixote is fighting back and reaching for his lance, he wakes up to find himself pummeling his servant Sancho Panza.

== Release ==
The film was released by Méliès's Star Film Company and is numbered 1367–1371 in its catalogues. It was registered for American copyright at the Library of Congress on 10 October 1908, and was first announced in the French publication Ciné-Journal on 20 October 1908. The film is currently presumed lost.
