= Good Glue Sticks =

- Directed by: Georges Méliès
- Starring: Georges Méliès
- Production company: Star Film Company
- Release date: 1907
- Country: France
- Language: Silent

Good Glue Sticks (French: La Colle universelle, literally "The Universal Glue") is a 1907 French short silent film by Georges Méliès. It was sold by Méliès's Star Film Company and is numbered 1005–1009 in its catalogues.

Méliès plays the street peddler in the film, which uses substitution splices for its special effects.

The earliest academic discussion of the film, in John Frazer's 1979 book Artificially Arranged Scenes: The Films of Georges Méliès, was based on a badly edited print, with the end of the film placed at the beginning. A 1981 guide to Méliès's films, published by the Centre national de la cinématographie, clarified the scene order.
