= A Novice at X-Rays =

1898 film directed by Georges Méliès

- Directed by: Georges Méliès
- Production company: Star Film Company
- Release date: 1898
- Country: France
- Language: Silent

A Novice at X-Rays (French: Les Rayons X; Les Rayons Roentgen) is an 1898 French short silent film by Georges Méliès. It was sold by Méliès's Star Film Company and is numbered 142 in its catalogues.

It may have been inspired by The X-Rays, an 1897 British film by the pioneering showman G. A. Smith, which in turn was likely partly inspired by previous films by Méliès. A Novice at X-Rays is currently presumed lost.
