= Tom Old Boot =

- Directed by: Georges Méliès
- Starring: Tom Old Boot
- Production company: Star Film Company
- Release date: 1896
- Country: France
- Language: Silent

Tom Old Boot (a grotesque dwarf) (French: Tom Old Boot (nain grotesque)) was an 1896 French short silent film by Georges Méliès. It was sold by Méliès's Star Film Company and is film #75 in its catalogues.

Though no synopsis survives, the film appears to have captured a performance by Tom Old Boot, a small-sized entertainer, who played at Méliès's stage venue, the Théâtre Robert-Houdin, as an "American dwarf" ("nain americain"). The magazine La Vie Parisienne reported that Tom Old Boot was playing at the Robert-Houdin Theatre in late December 1895, at Thursday and Sunday matinées. The reports claimed that the performances were a great success, getting many laughs, especially from the children in the audiences. The newspaper Le Petit Parisien reported on the March 1896 performances at the Robert-Houdin and called Tom Old Boot a "joyful, eccentric, dwarf comedian" ("joyeux nain comic excentric").

The film Tom Old Boot is presumed lost.
