= The Imperceptible Transmutations =

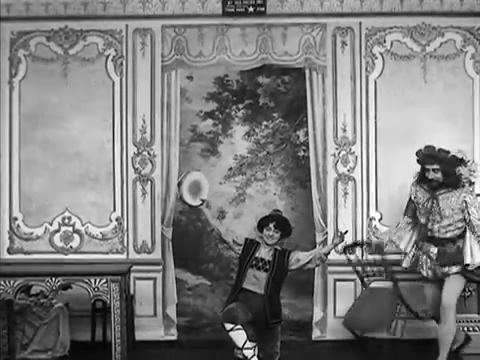
- A scene from the film
- Directed by: Georges Méliès
- Starring: Georges Méliès
- Production company: Star Film Company
- Release date: 1904
- Country: France
- Language: Silent

The Imperceptible Transmutations (1904)

Les Transmutations imperceptibles, sold in the United States as The Imperceptible Transmutations and in Britain as Imperceptible Transformation, is a 1904 French silent trick film by Georges Méliès. It was sold by Méliès's Star Film Company and is numbered 556–557 in its catalogues.

== Plot ==
A magician dressed as a Renaissance-era nobleman forms a cylinder from a large sheet of paper, and after showing that it is empty, conjures a boy inside it. The boy proceeds to dance with a tambourine. Placing the cylinder back around the boy and laying him out recumbent between a stool and chair, the magician causes him to vanish within the cylinder. Emphasizing the feat by throwing the cylinder away, the magician then reconjures the boy atop a table before suddenly transforming him into a maiden towards whom he makes amorous advances. Just as the magician is about to kiss her, she transforms back into the boy, much to the magician’s displeasure. He transforms the boy back into the maiden, and after both bow to the audience together, they depart offstage arm in arm.

== Production ==
Méliès stars in the film as the magician, who is identified in the Star Film catalogues as a prince. The special effects were created with substitution splices and dissolves.
