= Summoning the Spirits =

- Directed by: Georges Méliès
- Starring: Georges Méliès
- Production company: Star Film Company
- Release date: 1899
- Country: France
- Language: Silent

Summoning the Spirits (French: Évocation spirite) is an 1899 French silent trick film by Georges Méliès.

== Plot ==
A magician hangs a wreath in the air and makes a grotesque face appear inside it. He then replaces it with a woman's face, and finally with a copy of his own face.

== Release and survival ==
Méliès himself plays the magician in the film. Summoning the Spirits was sold by Méliès's Star Film Company and is numbered 205 in its catalogues, where it was advertised as a scène à transformations.

Méliès burned all the surviving original camera negatives of his films toward the end of his life, and about three-fifths of his output is presumed lost. Summoning the Spirits was among the lost films until 2007, when a copy was identified and restored by the Filmoteca de Catalunya.
