= The Miser (1908 film) =

- Surviving footage from The Miser
- Directed by: Georges Méliès
- Starring: Georges Méliès
- Production company: Star Film Company
- Release date: 1908
- Country: France
- Language: Silent

The Miser (French: L'Avare) is a 1908 French short silent film directed by Georges Méliès.

== Production ==
The miser character in the film is probably Harpagon, from Molière's play The Miser. Méliès appears in the film both as the poor man and as the man who brings the cask back.

Close viewing of the first scene indicates that it was filmed in Méliès's glass-roofed studio beneath a cloudy sky. When the sun comes out, the shadows it casts are clearly visible for several seconds; then, as tracing-paper panels are put against the glass to diffuse the light, the panel's shadows also become visible. Some of the film was shot outside, in the garden of Méliès's property in Montreuil, Seine-Saint-Denis.

== Release and survival ==
The Miser was released by Méliès's Star Film Company and is numbered 1146–1158 in its catalogues, where it is listed as a scène artistique dramatico-comique. The surviving print is incomplete; another scene is evidenced in a production still, but it is presumed lost.
