= Jack and Jim =

- Directed by: Georges Méliès
- Starring: Georges Méliès
- Production company: Star Film Company
- Release date: 1903
- Country: France
- Language: Silent

Jack et Jim, sold in the United States as Jack and Jim and in Britain as Comical Conjuring, is a 1903 French silent trick film by Georges Méliès. It was sold by Méliès's Star Film Company and is numbered 517–519 in its catalogues.

Méliès plays the juggler in the film, which uses substitution splices and gunfire for its special effects.

== Cast ==
- Jules-Eugène Legris as Jim
- Georges Méliès
