= A Mesmerian Experiment =

1905 film

- Directed by: Georges Méliès
- Production company: Star Film Company
- Release date: 1905
- Country: France
- Language: Silent

A Mesmerian Experiment (French: Le Baquet de Mesmer) is a 1905 French silent trick film by Georges Méliès. It was sold by Méliès's Star Film Company and is numbered 693–695 in its catalogues.

Méliès appears in the film Doctor Mesmer. The film has few illusions, and is mainly a vehicle for its troupe of dancers, identified in Méliès's American film catalogue as the "Snow-drops" of London's Alhambra Theatre of Variety. The film's technical effects were carried out with pyrotechnics and substitution splices.
