= Love and Molasses =

- Directed by: Georges Méliès or Manuel
- Production company: Star Film Company
- Release date: 1908
- Country: France
- Language: Silent

Love and Molasses, also known as His First Job and in French as Amour et mélasse, is a 1908 French short silent film credited to Georges Méliès. It was sold in the United States by Méliès's Star Film Company and is numbered 1246–1249 in its catalogues; no release is documented in Méliès's native France at the time.

A 1981 analysis of the film's style, published in a Centre national de la cinématographie guide to Méliès's work, concluded that this film is probably one of those directed by Méliès's employee, an actor known as Manuel. The "molasses" featured in the film is actually water; the film's special effects are worked with substitution splices.
