= Jupiter's Thunderbolts =

1903 film by Georges Méliès

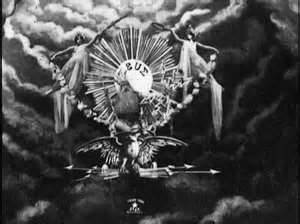
- A scene from the film
- Directed by: Georges Méliès
- Starring: Georges Méliès
- Production company: Star Film Company
- Release date: 1903
- Country: France
- Language: Silent

Jupiter's Thunderbolts, or the Home of the Muses (French: Le Tonnerre de Jupiter), also known as Jupiter's Thunderballs, is a 1903 French silent trick film by Georges Méliès. It was sold by Méliès's Star Film Company and is numbered 503–505 in its catalogues.

== Plot ==
Jupiter's Thunderbolts (1903)

High in the clouds, Jupiter encounters Mercury and summons up pedestals for all the Muses. He attempts to make the Muses themselves appear using his thunderbolts, but finds the bolts do not work. He sends them off to Hephaestus for repairs, and after some trial and error, manages to summon all nine Muses.

The Muses all begin performing their various arts; Jupiter is initially pleased, but the cacophony soon overwhelms him, and he finally sends the Muses back to their pedestals. Mercury and Hephaestus return, making still more noise, and Jupiter banishes the whole company with his thunderbolts. However, this time the power backfires on him, and Jupiter makes a hasty retreat as the thunderbolts spin out of control.

== Production and themes ==
The film is advertised in Méliès's American catalogue as "a mythological burlesque," and it is indeed a highly parodic look at mythology, probably a freewheeling spoof of Méliès's recollections of learning Classics at school. Jupiter is played by Méliès himself as an obese comic role, while Mercury's running in place is a spoofing reference to Mercury's song in the Offenbach opera Orpheus in the Underworld. The film's special effects are created using stage machinery, pyrotechnics, and substitution splices.

Classics scholar Pantelis Michelakis, highlighting Jupiter's interactions with the muses, sees the film as an allegory in which Jupiter stands for the filmmaker, "the new master of the arts, with the power to conjure up painting, sculpture, song, music and dance, to combine them into an intermedial and interactive spectacle but also to quell their insubordination."
