= Seein' Things (1908 film) =

- Directed by: Georges Méliès
- Starring: Georges Méliès
- Release date: 1908
- Running time: 140 meters
- Country: France
- Language: Silent

Seein' Things (French: Fin de réveillon), also known as Seeing Things, is a 1908 French short silent comedy film directed by Georges Méliès.

== Plot ==
A partygoer (played by Méliès) comes home very drunk, and finds that his drunkenness makes him see two of everything.

== Release and reception ==
The film was released by Méliès's Star Film Company and is numbered 1460–1466 in its catalogues. The New York Mirror gave the film a brief review after its American release as Seeing Things in December 1909, saying that "the subject possesses a fair amount of amusing interest."

The film is currently presumed lost.
