= Post No Bills (1896 film) =

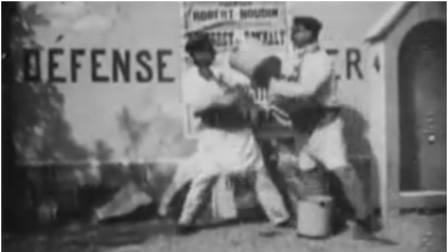
- Screenshot from the film
- Directed by: Georges Méliès
- Release date: 1896
- Running time: 74 seconds
- Country: France
- Language: Silent

Post No Bills (French: Défense d'afficher) is an 1896 French short black-and-white silent comedy film, directed by Georges Méliès, featuring two bill-posters squabbling over a poorly guarded wall. The film, one of Méliès' early works, was long thought lost, but was recovered in 2004 making it the oldest rediscovered film. It is number 15 on the Star Films catalog. Post No Bills is 74 seconds long.

== Synopsis ==
The full film

A sentry marches past a wall, upon which is painted Défense d'afficher (Post No Bills). A bill poster waits for him to pass and pastes up an advertising bill. A second bill poster covers the first ad with a larger poster. The two bill posters squabble, and then flee at the approach of the sentry. The sentry is then reprimanded by his commander for the defacing of the wall.

== See also ==
- List of rediscovered films
