= The Prophetess of Thebes =

- Surviving footage from The Prophetess of Thebes
- Directed by: Georges Méliès
- Starring: Georges Méliès
- Production company: Star Film Company
- Release date: 1908
- Country: France
- Language: Silent

The Prophetess of Thebes (French: La Prophétesse de Thèbes) was a 1908 French silent trick film by Georges Méliès. The film, set in Ancient Egypt, followed the adventure of a king seeing his future foretold by means of a mysterious priestess and a magical telescope. A fragment of the film has been recovered; the rest is presumed lost.

== Plot ==
In ancient Thebes, the king visits an astrologer to discover his future. The astrologer vehemently refuses, even when threatened with execution, but finally arranges to satisfy the king's demand without delivering the prophecy himself. He assembles sculpted pieces into a statue of a priestess, and the statue comes to life.

The prophetess of Thebes has the king look through a magic telescope, which reveals to him that he will be assassinated while on his throne. The king flies into a rage and tries to stab the prophetess, but she disappears into thin air. The astrologer too proves impervious to damage; blades and assailants simply bounce off him. Finally the king is told that he can lift the curse by paying the astrologer a heavy bag of gold. He does and leaves. The astrologer, the prophetess, and their assistant gather together and laugh over the bag of gold.

== Production ==
Méliès appeared in the film as the astrologer. The film's set is, in Méliès's work, a rare example of scenery built so that the camera is looking directly at an angle. The unusual design may indicate Méliès trying to keep up with the visual innovations of other filmmakers, while maintaining his own style and process.

== Release ==
The Prophetess of Thebes was sold by Méliès's Star Film Company and is numbered 1096–1101 in its catalogues.

The film was presumed lost in a 2008 filmography, though a short fragment was rediscovered in time to be included in a DVD collection of some of Méliès's films the same year.

== See also ==
- Madame de Thèbes
