= Fortune Favors the Brave (film) =

- Directed by: Georges Méliès
- Starring: André Méliès; Georges Méliès
- Production company: Star Film Company
- Release date: 1908
- Country: France
- Language: Silent

Fortune Favors the Brave (French: Le Génie des cloches ou le Fils du sonneur, literally "The Genie of the Bells, or the Bellringer's Son") is a 1908 French silent fantasy film directed by Georges Méliès.

== Plot ==
A young boy's adventure takes him to the domain of the Genie of the Cathedral Bell, where he finds a fortune to enrich his family.

== Production ==
A surviving production still reveals that Méliès appears in the film as a gnome; his son, André Méliès, plays the young boy.

== Release and reception ==
The film was released by Méliès's Star Film Company and is numbered 1394–1407 in its catalogues.

The New York Mirror gave the film a brief review after its American release in December 1909, saying that it "will please the children, who will not be too critical of the stage management."

The film is currently presumed lost.
