= Every Man His Own Cigar Lighter =

- Directed by: Georges Méliès
- Starring: Georges Méliès
- Production company: Star Film Company
- Release date: 1904
- Country: France
- Language: Silent

Every Man His Own Cigar Lighter (French: Un peu de feu, S.V.P.) was a 1904 French short silent film by Georges Méliès.

== Plot ==
An English tourist, sightseeing in Paris, wants to light his cigarette but does not have a match. He stops a passing coal deliverer and attempts to ask for a match, but cannot make himself understood. Rifling through all his pockets, the tourist finds one match, but it will not light, and another passerby also cannot help. Finally, the tourist splits himself into two identical Englishmen, one of whom lights the other's cigarette. The two doubles exit to have a drink together, linking arms and merging back into one man.

== Production and release ==
Méliès played both the English tourist and his double, with both seen in the same frame by means of multiple exposure. Every Man His Own Cigar Lighter was one of several Méliès films featuring doubling, reflecting nineteenth-century Europe's fascination with the Doppelgänger; other such films include The Triple Lady (1898), The Triple Conjuror and the Living Head (1900), The Magic Lantern (1903), and Baron Munchausen's Dream (1911). Susan Daitch's 2011 novel Paper Conspiracies cites the film as a metaphor for "times when it's impossible to ask anyone for anything, all you can do is rely on yourself, split yourself in two".

The film was sold by Méliès's Star Film Company and is numbered 545 in its catalogues. A very brief fragment of the film survives, showing Méliès's character smoking in close-up. The rest is presumed lost.
