= The Venetian Looking-Glass =

- Directed by: Georges Méliès
- Based on: The Merchant of Venice by William Shakespeare
- Production company: Star Film Company
- Release date: 1905
- Country: France
- Language: Silent

The Venetian Looking-Glass (French: Le Miroir de Venise) is a 1905 French short silent film by Georges Méliès.

The main character, consistently spelled "Schylock" in Méliès's materials, was inspired by Shylock from William Shakespeare's The Merchant of Venice. Shakespeare-on-film scholar Judith Buchanan concludes that the film was "probably only mildly Shakespearean."

The film was sold by Méliès's Star Film Company and is numbered 699–701 in its catalogues, where it was advertised as une mésaventure de Schylock ("a misadventure of Shylock"). It is currently presumed lost.
