= The Sacred Fountain =

- Directed by: Georges Méliès
- Release date: 1901
- Running time: 2min
- Country: France
- Language: Silent

The Sacred Fountain (French: La Fontaine sacrée ou la Vengeance de Boudha) is a 1901 French short silent comedy film, directed by Georges Méliès. It is listed as number 360 in Star Film Company's catalogues. The film is believed to be lost.
