= The Queen's Musketeers =

- Directed by: Georges Méliès
- Production company: Star Film Company
- Release date: 1903
- Country: France
- Language: Silent

Les Mousquetaires de la reine, sold in the United States as The Queen's Musketeers and in Britain as The Musketeers of the Queen, is a 1903 French silent trick film by Georges Méliès.

The film was likely derived from Alexandre Dumas's novel The Three Musketeers, and is an early example of costume drama in French cinema. Méliès appeared in the film; a production still survives at the Cinémathèque Française that shows him at the far left.

The film was sold by Méliès's Star Film Company and is numbered 460–461 in its catalogues. It is currently presumed lost.
