= A Serpentine Dance =

Danse Serpentine (1896 film)
- Directed by: Georges Méliès
- Release date: 1896
- Running time: 20 meters/65 feet
- Country: France
- Language: Silent

A Serpentine Dance (French: Danse Serpentine) is an 1896 French silent film directed by Georges Méliès. It was released by Méliès's company Star Film and is numbered 44 in its catalogues. The film is currently presumed lost.
