= The Indian Sorcerer =

1908 film by Georges Méliès

- Directed by: Georges Méliès
- Starring: Georges Méliès
- Production company: Star Film Company
- Release date: 1908
- Country: France
- Language: Silent

The Indian Sorcerer (French: Le Fakir de Singapour) is a 1908 French silent trick film by Georges Méliès. It was sold by Méliès's Star Film Company and is numbered 1253–1257 in its catalogues.

== Plot ==
In an open space in front of houses built in Moorish style, overlooking palm trees and a body of water, a woman is dusting a painting of a sorcerer in a turban and long robes. Suddenly the sorcerer himself bursts through the painting and indulges in a variety of magic tricks, with the woman looking on and sometimes taking part. First the sorcerer makes an egg appear from her ear; then he makes it grow to enormous size, cuts it neatly in half, and combines the two half-shells with a palm tree and a pair of spectacles to make a giant weighing scale. Putting ingredients into the two half-shells and putting them back together, he cooks the egg over a fire and makes a flock of hens, and then two tiny children, appear from it. For a finale, he makes the woman herself burst from the egg. She takes a bow and exits, and the sorcerer puts one half-shell on his back and crawls happily away.

== Production ==
Méliès himself plays the title role in the film, which uses pyrotechnics and substitution splices to create its special effects.
