= The Dwarf and the Giant =

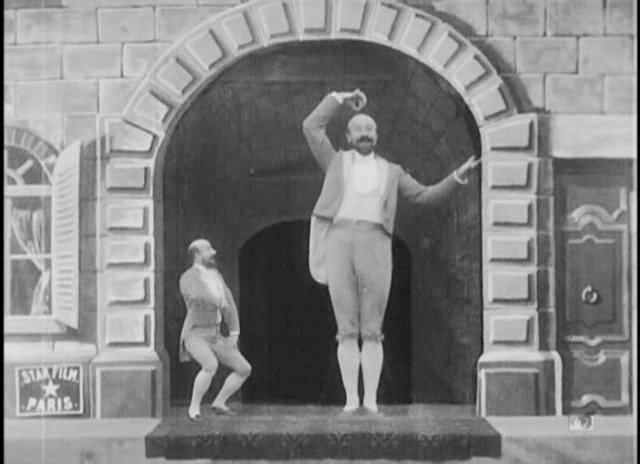
- Directed by: Georges Méliès
- Release date: 1901
- Running time: 1 minute
- Country: France
- Language: Silent with English intertitles

The Dwarf and the Giant (French: Nain et géant) is a 1901 French silent trick film directed by and starring Georges Méliès. It is the earliest known film depicting a person shrinking down.

== Plot ==
The Dwarf and the Giant (1901)

A man, portrayed by Méliès, is split into two figures: an augmented and a shrunken version of himself. Méliès starts standing in front of a doorway before the split, and his giant self and dwarf engage in jocularity, before moving back into the doorway and going their separate ways.
