= The Old Footlight Favorite =

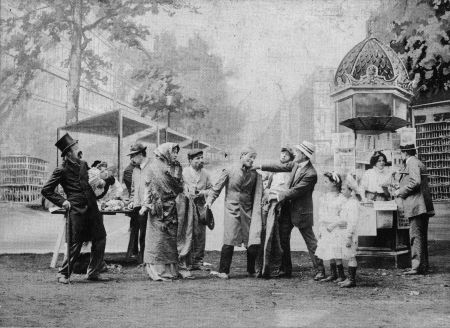
- Publicity still for the film
- Directed by: Georges Méliès
- Production company: Star Film Company
- Release date: October 1908 (US)
- Running time: 588 feet (approx. 10 minutes)
- Country: France
- Language: Silent

The Old Footlight Favorite (French: Trop vieux!, literally "Too Old!") is a 1908 French short silent film by Georges Méliès.

== Plot ==
An elderly actor, once an audience favorite, goes to a talent agency for work, but is told he is too old to be hired. Going home, he tells the bad news to his wife. They pawn most of their possessions, and end up begging on the streets. There they happen to come across a familiar face: a star performer, who rose to fame after getting valuable advice from the older actor. The star, finding his mentor impoverished, offers his home as a place to live.

== Release ==
The film was sold by Méliès's Star Film Company and is numbered 1329–1336 in its catalogues. It is currently presumed lost.
