= The Frozen Policeman =

1908 film by Georges Méliès

- Directed by: Georges Méliès
- Production company: Star Film Company
- Release date: 1908
- Country: France
- Language: Silent

The Frozen Policeman (French: L'Agent gelé) is a 1908 French short silent film by Georges Méliès. No Star Film Company catalogue number is known for it.

The film is rare among Méliès's fiction films in using location shooting of real outdoor landscapes rather than painted scenery. Some of the Méliès family property in Montreuil-sous-Bois can be seen in it, including outside views of Méliès's parents' house and his first glass studio, Studio A.

No English-language release is documented for the film, but the translated title The Frozen Policeman has been used in academic work.
