= Honeymoon in a Balloon =

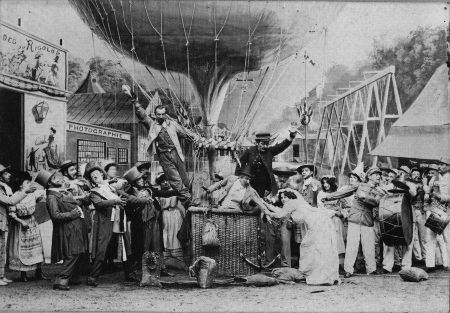
- The balloon prepares for liftoff in a surviving production still for the film
- Directed by: Georges Méliès
- Production company: Star Film Company
- Release date: October 1908
- Running time: 430 feet (approx. 6.5 minutes)
- Country: France
- Language: Silent

L'Ascension de la rosière, released in the United States as Honeymoon in a Balloon and in Britain as The Ascension of a Communicant, is a 1908 French short silent comedy film directed by Georges Méliès. The film is now considered lost.

== Plot ==
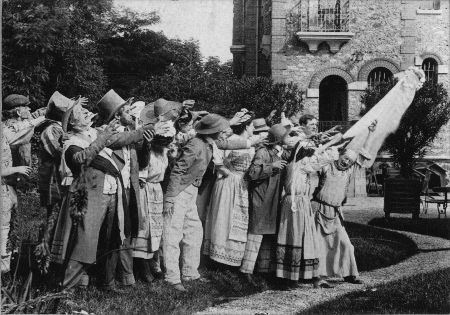
The onlookers chase the balloon in another production still

At a Rosière or May Day festival, a young bride-to-be is crowned the Rose Queen or May Queen. Her bridegroom decides to take a flight with a balloonist who has set up at a nearby fairground. The bride, running to join him, arrives just as the balloon is lifting off; not quite able to get into the basket, she is caught by the balloon's anchor as it floats away. Onlookers, realizing what has happened, make a mad dash to keep up with the balloon, but their hectic chase proves futile. Bride and balloon make a crash-landing through the ceiling of a large hall, where the town mayor and his worthies are banqueting. The couple are finally reunited, and the bride has her May Queen crown of flowers restored to her as all celebrate the safe conclusion of the adventure.

== Release ==
The film was released by Méliès's Star Film Company and is numbered 1347–1352 in its catalogues. It is currently presumed lost.
