= The Crystal Casket =

- Surviving footage from The Crystal Casket
- Directed by: Georges Méliès
- Based on: "Le Dé Grossissant" by Buatier de Kolta
- Starring: Georges Méliès
- Production company: Star Film Company
- Release date: 1905
- Country: France
- Language: Silent

The Crystal Casket (French: Le Phénix ou le Coffret de cristal), also known as The Magic Dice, is a 1905 French silent trick film by Georges Méliès. It was sold by Méliès's Star Film Company and is numbered 686–689 in its catalogues.

Méliès is the magician in the film, which is based on a famous stage magic act, "Le Dé Grossissant", conceived by the illusionist Buatier de Kolta. De Kolta made a die grow before the audience's eyes, then made his wife appear out of it. The tricks in Méliès's version are carried out using a combination of stage machinery and substitution splices.

A fragment of the film still exists, and has been released on home video.
