= Conjurer Making Ten Hats in Sixty Seconds =

Dix Chapeaux en 60 secondes
- Directed by: Georges Méliès
- Release date: 1896
- Running time: 20 meters/65 feet
- Country: France
- Language: Silent

Conjurer Making Ten Hats in Sixty Seconds (French: Dix Chapeaux en 60 secondes), also advertised as Dix Chapeaux en une minute and Dix Chapeaux à la minute, is an 1896 French short film directed by Georges Méliès. It was released by Méliès's company Star Film and is numbered 42 in its catalogues. The film is currently presumed lost.
