= Shakespeare Writing "Julius Caesar" =

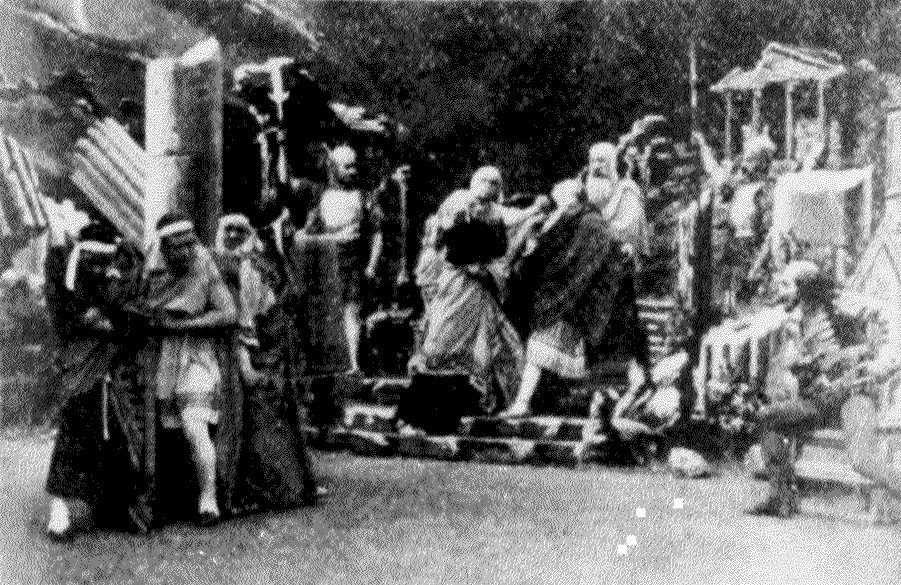
- Shakespeare imagines the conspirators in a production still from the film
- Directed by: Georges Méliès
- Based on: Julius Caesar by William Shakespeare
- Starring: Georges Méliès
- Production company: Star Film Company
- Release date: October 1907
- Country: France
- Language: Silent

Shakespeare Writing "Julius Caesar" (French: La Mort de Jules César (Shakespeare), "The Death of Julius Caesar (Shakespeare)"), also known as La Rêve de Shakespeare, is a 1907 French short silent film directed by Georges Méliès. The film, currently presumed lost, featured Méliès himself as a William Shakespeare moving from frustration to excitement as he imagines and plans a pivotal scene for his play Julius Caesar. The film has received scholarly attention for its meta-narrative themes, its cosmopolitan political overtones, and its flamboyant use of theatrical and cinematic effects.

== Summary ==
William Shakespeare, struggling to write the assassination scene for his play Julius Caesar, settles into an armchair and begins to daydream. In his thoughts, a forum in ancient Rome appears, attended by women in classical dress. As Shakespeare watches the action from his armchair, the conspirators, including Brutus and Cassius, enter vehemently discussing the tyranny of Julius Caesar. They swear together to assassinate Caesar, who then enters attended by consuls. The conspirators approach Caesar as if asking for an audience, and attack him with their daggers and swords.

The vision disappears, and Shakespeare finds himself back in his own study, excited to write the scene he has just imagined. As he paces the room planning out the dialogue, a servant enters and puts food on the table; Shakespeare, reaching the moment of the assassination itself, seizes a knife and dramatically attacks a loaf of bread. Shakespeare, suddenly realizing how carried away he has become, laughs with his servant. A final scene shows figures representing all the countries of the world, holding garlands and flags, paying homage to a bust of Shakespeare.

== Production ==
Méliès himself plays Shakespeare in the film. The film was his last cinematic work derived from the plays of William Shakespeare; earlier in the same year, Méliès had filmed a film adaptation of Shakespeare's Hamlet.

== Release and reception ==
Shakespeare Writing "Julius Caesar" was released by Méliès's Star Film Company, and is numbered 995–999 in its catalogues. It was registered for American copyright at the Library of Congress on 25 October 1907. The film is currently presumed lost.

Film scholar Robert Hamilton Ball, in his study of Shakespearean silent films, calls the film "a pleasant little scenario", but comments that the film's concluding tableau, strongly reminiscent of Méliès's work as a magician, "unfortunately shows … the need for a transformation, however inappropriate." Film scholar Judith Buchanan emphasises the cosmopolitan political effect of this final scene, which she describes as a "sentimental tribute to a universalising poet". Buchanan argues that this all-embracing view of Shakespeare puts Méliès's film in sharp contrast with the next known adaptation of the play, Vitagraph Studios's Julius Caesar the following year; Vitagraph's version heavily underlined its Americanness and prioritised "individual patriotism" above global concerns.

In an article on Shakespearean cinema, Anthony Guneratne mentions the film, highlighting that by "showing the poet struggling to dramatize difficult material," Méliès created "a special-effects-dominated precursor of Shakespeare in Love". The historian Deborah Cartmell comments: "It's not hard to speculate that Méliès's decision to play the part of the playwright is an implicit assertion that the filmmaker is 'the new Shakespeare,' but, as the film is no longer available, it is impossible to know how far this can be taken."
