= A Lightning Sketch =

- Directed by: Georges Méliès
- Release date: 1896
- Running time: 20 meters/65 feet each
- Country: France
- Language: Silent

A Lightning Sketch (French: Dessinateur) was a series of four 1896 French short silent films directed by Georges Méliès and released by his Star Film Company. Each film showed an artist—very probably Méliès himself—drawing a caricature of a notable political figure in less than a minute.

Three similar films were also made at about the same time, in July 1896, by the Anglo-American filmmaker J. Stuart Blackton, as a series called Blackton Sketches; Blackton would later make another film in the same vein, The Enchanted Drawing (1900). Méliès returned to sketching on film in his 1903 short The Untamable Whiskers, in which the process of drawing comic faces on a blackboard was undercranked so as to seem to occur with great speed. Numerous political caricatures by Méliès, presumably similar to those made in the A Lightning Sketch films, survive in the collection of the Centre national du cinéma.

All four films in the A Lightning Sketch series are currently presumed lost.

== Summary ==
The following table provides the number assigned to each film in the Star Film Company catalogues, the English and French titles, and the subject of the drawing made in each film.

#	English title	French title	Subject
37	A Lightning Sketch (Mr. Thiers)	Dessinateur express (M. Thiers)	Adolphe Thiers
57	A Lightning Sketch (Chamberlain)	Dessinateur (Chamberlain)	Joseph Chamberlain
61	A Lightning Sketch (H.M. Queen Victoria)	Dessinateur (Reine Victoria)	Queen Victoria
73	A Lightning Sketch (Von Bismarck)	Dessinateur (Von Bismarck)	Otto von Bismarck
