= Dancing in a Harem =

- Directed by: Georges Méliès
- Production company: Star Film Company
- Release date: 1897
- Country: France
- Language: Silent

Dancing in a Harem (French: Danse au sérail) is an 1897 French short silent film by Georges Méliès. It was sold by Méliès's Star Film Company and is numbered 132 in its catalogues.

The Méliès scholar John Frazer was unable to obtain a print, but speculated in 1979 that a fragment may survive in Budapest. The Internet Movie Database lists a 1989 Hungarian TV miniseries on film history, Fejezetek a film történetéböl, that purportedly includes a clip from the film. Jacques Malthête's 2008 Méliès filmography lists the film as presumed lost.
