= The Helping Hand (1908 French film) =

1908 film by Georges Méliès

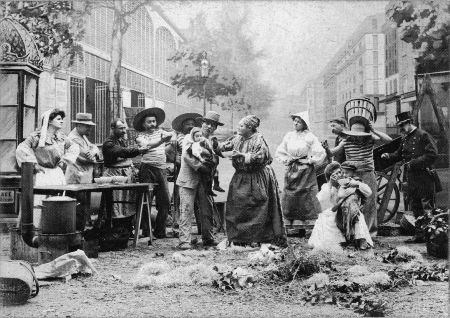
- Publicity still for the film
- Directed by: Georges Méliès
- Production company: Star Film Company
- Release date: October 1908 (US)
- Country: France
- Language: Silent

The Helping Hand (French: Pour les p'tiots, literally "For the Little Ones") is a 1908 French short silent film by Georges Méliès.

== Plot ==
An impoverished father, with his young son and daughter, begs for food in a marketplace. When a merchant angrily turns them away, their plight attracts the attention of a woman of charity. Calling shame upon the unkind merchant, she buys the poor family some food, talks with the family, and adopts the two children. Marketplace workers, witnessing the scene, give the father work as a sign carrier.

== Release ==
The Helping Hand was sold by Méliès's Star Film Company and is numbered 1326–1328 in its catalogues. The American trade periodical The Moving Picture World, in a brief notice about some of Méliès' films, praised The Helping Hand for offering "a wholesome lesson of charity."

The film is currently presumed lost.
