= Why That Actor Was Late =

- Directed by: Georges Méliès or Manuel
- Produced by: Georges Méliès
- Starring: Henri Vilbert
- Production company: Star Film Company
- Release date: 1908
- Country: France
- Language: Silent

Why That Actor Was Late is a 1908 French short silent comedy film produced by Georges Méliès, and probably directed by Méliès's assistant, an actor credited as Manuel.

== Production ==
Henri Vilbert, a headlining star of the Parisian music hall Parisiana and the Folies-Bergère, plays the lead role of the actor. The film was made for performances when Vilbert was appearing; it was screened just before he entered the stage for his live act. Vilbert also appears in Méliès's film The Hilarious Posters.

The actors Gallois and Emile Gajean appear in the film as mechanics. Since the film shows a realistic sensibility, markedly different from the theatrical style and rhythm used by Méliès, it was probably directed not by Méliès himself but by his production assistant, the actor Manuel.

== Release ==
In addition to its screenings before Vibert's performances, the film was released in the United States as a standalone item by Méliès's Star Film Company. It is numbered 1073–1080 in its catalogues.
