= The Tower of London (1905 film) =

- Directed by: Georges Méliès
- Starring: Marguerite Thévenard
- Production company: Star Film Company
- Release date: 1905
- Country: France
- Language: Silent

The Tower of London (French: Le Tour de Londres ou les Derniers Moments d'Anne de Boleyn) is a 1905 French short silent film by Georges Méliès.

== Plot ==
Anne Boleyn is locked in Beauchamp Tower in the Tower of London. Falling asleep, she dreams of her past days as Queen of England; then, the vision shifting, she dreams herself condemned to death, and executed in the Tower courtyard. When she awakes, she is indeed sentenced to death, and led out to the scaffold.

== Production and release ==
The film, featuring Marguerite Thévenard as Anne Boleyn, was sold by Méliès's Star Film Company and is numbered 732–737 in its catalogues. Méliès's 1908 American catalogue gives the film the subtitle "The Death of Anne Boleyn, Queen of England," and describes it as a "Dramatic Composition in 5 Scenes."

The Tower of London is currently presumed lost.
