= Lucy Fischer =

American film studies scholar

Lucy Fischer (born 1945) is an American film studies scholar currently Distinguished Professor at University of Pittsburgh.

In 2001–03 Fisher was a President of the Society for Cinema and Media Studies.

== Selected works ==
- Fischer, Lucy (2003). Designing Women: Cinema, Art Deco, and the Female Form. Columbia University Press. ISBN 0-231-12501-1.
- Fischer, Lucy; Landy, Marcia (2004). Stars: The Film Reader. Psychology Press.
- Fischer, Lucy, ed. (2009). American cinema of the 1920s: themes and variations. Rutgers. ISBN 9780813544854.
