= A Funny Mahometan =

1897 film directed by Georges Méliès

- Starring: Georges Méliès
- Production company: Star Film Company
- Release date: 1897
- Running time: 20 meters
- Country: France
- Language: Silent

A Funny Mahometan (French: Le Musulman rigolo) was an 1897 short silent comedy film directed by Georges Méliès. It was released by Méliès's Star Film Company and numbered 94 in its catalogues, where it was advertised as a scène comique.

The film was shot outside in the garden of Méliès's property in Montreuil, Seine-Saint-Denis, with painted scenery. Méliès himself played the Muslim of the title. A Funny Mahometan, with its presumably Algerian Muslim, is the first known film on an Algerian topic in cinema history.

The film is currently presumed lost.
