= The Clockmaker's Dream =

- Directed by: Georges Méliès
- Starring: Georges Méliès
- Production company: Star Film Company
- Release date: 1904
- Country: France
- Language: Silent

Le Rêve de l'horloger, sold in the United States as The Clockmaker's Dream and in Britain as The Dream of the Clock Maker, is a 1904 French silent trick film by Georges Méliès. It was sold by Méliès's Star Film Company and is numbered 554–555 in its catalogues.

Méliès plays the clockmaker in the film, which uses substitution splices and dissolves for its special effects. Méliès reused the globe prop and park backdrop in The Wonderful Living Fan, made later the same year.
