= The Rag-Picker =

Le Chiffonnier
- Directed by: Georges Méliès
- Release date: 1896
- Running time: 20 meters/65 feet
- Country: France
- Language: Silent

The Rag Picker (French: Le Chiffonnier), also released as A Good Joke (French: Une bonne farce), was an 1896 French short silent film directed by Georges Méliès. It was released by Méliès's company Star Film and is numbered 9 in its catalogues. The film is currently presumed lost.
