= Not Guilty (1908 film) =

1908 film by Georges Méliès

- Directed by: Georges Méliès or Manuel
- Produced by: Georges Méliès
- Starring: Georges Méliès
- Production company: Star Film Company
- Release date: 1908
- Running time: 11 minutes
- Country: France
- Language: Silent

Not Guilty (French: Anaïc ou le Balafré) is a 1908 French short silent film credited to Georges Méliès. It was sold by Méliès's Star Film Company and is numbered 1301–1309 in its catalogues.

An analysis in a Centre national de la cinématographie (CNC) guide to Méliès's films concludes that the film was probably directed not by Méliès but by an employee of his, an actor known as Manuel. The copy reviewed for the CNC guide proved to be edited non-chronologically, with the scenes out of order; this condition suggests that Not Guilty was one of a batch of films Méliès's team produced in a hasty assembly line fashion, and sent to America before it had been edited into shape.

== Cast ==
- Georges Méliès as The Old Farmer(unconfirmed) (uncredited)
