= Pygmalion and Galatea (film) =

- Directed by: Georges Méliès
- Starring: Georges Méliès; Jehanne d'Alcy
- Release date: 1898
- Running time: 20 meters/65 feet
- Country: France
- Language: Silent

Pygmalion and Galatea (French: Pygmalion et Galathée) is an 1898 French silent trick film directed by Georges Méliès, based on the ancient Pygmalion myth.

== Plot ==
The sculptor Pygmalion, completing his statue of Galatea, is madly in love with it. To his delight, Galatea comes to life. When he tries to embrace her, however, she magically changes place; then her upper and lower halves come apart, much to Pygmalion's confusion. Galatea's halves join back together again, but just as he is about to kiss her at last, she steps back onto her pedestal and becomes a statue again.

== Production ==
The Pygmalion myth had long been popular with theatrical illusionists. Pygmalion and Galatea was the first film adaptation of the story; many others followed it in the silent era and beyond. Méliès and Jehanne d'Alcy play the roles of Pygmalion and Galatea in the film.

Ideas from the myth returned in later films by Méliès, including The Brahmin and the Butterfly (1901), in which the woman's power and freedom of choice are emphasized, and which Jennifer Forrest summarized as "a Pygmalion and Galatea scenario gone wrong"; The Drawing Lesson, or the Living Statue (1903), in which a mischievous magician creates an equally mischievous Galatea to bewilder a drawing instructor; and Ten Ladies in One Umbrella (1903), in which a Pygmalion-like Méliès conjures up women in front of a sign labeled "Galathea Theater".

== Release and survival ==
The film was released by Méliès's Star Film Company and is numbered 156 in its catalogues. It was presumed lost until 1993, when a print was found in an attic in Barcelona.

== Reception ==
François de la Bretèque described the film as "a metaphor on the image-maker, in other words the film-maker: the one who tries to give life to the simulacra engendered by his imagination". Allison de Fren highlighted the implicit drama between the on-screen artist (played by Méliès) attempting to create a permanent work of art, and the off-screen filmmaker (also Méliès) playing magical tricks on him: "Even Pygmalion, that rare soul whose encounter with a living statue ends happily, is in Méliès's reinterpretation confronted with a Galatea who refuses to be contained."

Gaby Wood called Pygmalion and Galatea "a perfect metaphor for the magic of moving film. Everything that was wrapped up in the medium's early days is there: the desires, the fears, the superstitions, the power and the hysterical zaniness of its first jagged steps."
