= The Magic Lantern (film) =

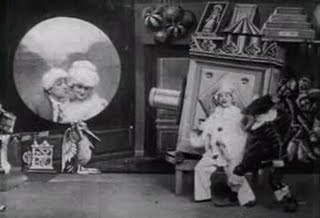
- A frame from the film
- Directed by: Georges Méliès
- Starring: Zizi Papillon
- Production company: Star Film Company
- Release date: 1903
- Country: France
- Language: Silent

La Lanterne magique, sold in the United States as The Magic Lantern and in Britain as The Magic Lantern, or the Bioscope in the Toy Shop, is a 1903 French silent trick film by Georges Méliès. It was sold by Méliès's Star Film Company and is numbered 520–524 in its catalogues.

== Production ==
The Magic Lantern (1903)

During Méliès's career as a stage illusionist, the magic lantern was a major part of popular entertainment. Méliès, like many magicians before him, used magic lantern slides as part of his stage entertainments, and is known to have sometimes designed his own slides. One of his earliest films, A Terrible Night, may even have been directly inspired by a series of comic lantern slides published in the 1880s by the English firm of Bamforth & Co Ltd. However, The Magic Lantern, the only known Méliès film in which the lantern makes an onscreen appearance, shows the device in a different context than professional entertainment: from the mid-19th century onward, many magic lanterns were designed on inexpensive but highly decorated lines, as toys for children. Though the popularity of toy magic lanterns was fading by the time of Méliès's film, they would have remained a nostalgic memory for many of Méliès's viewers; writers and artists who spoke fondly of their childhood toy lanterns include Ingmar Bergman, Vladimir Nabokov, and Marcel Proust.

In planning the film, Méliès used the toy lantern not only as a focal point for his toys-coming-to-life theme, but also as an adaptation of magic tricks where people and things can be taken from or hidden inside a magical box. A Centre national de la cinématographie guide to Méliès's films notes that the toys featured are "the classic characters of pantomime". Méliès's American catalogue advertises the film as including a new special effect, superimposition on a white background. In fact, Méliès worked the trick differently: actually the special effect, a filmed scene matted into a circle, is superimposed by multiple exposure onto a black background, as was Méliès's typical practice. Other technical effects used in the film are worked by substitution splices and dissolves.

== Themes ==
Film scholars Giusy Pisano and Caroline Renouard see the film as symbolizing how the magic lantern had been replaced in popular entertainment by film: the various tricks and specialties suggest cinema's potential for capturing movement and drama, culminating in a magically expanding monster that can be taken to stand for cinema itself. Media historian Meredith Bak highlights how the film's action neatly matches its setting, with magic appearances from the lantern's box suggesting a toy box coming to life, and how the film must have "conjured viewers' memories of their own childhoods illuminated by the magic lantern, where their fantasies were animated by a rich world of projected images."
