= The Bewitched Trunk =

- Directed by: Georges Méliès
- Starring: Georges Méliès
- Production company: Star Film Company
- Release date: 1904
- Country: France
- Language: Silent

Le Coffre enchanté, sold in the United States as The Bewitched Trunk and in Britain as The Enchanted Trunk, is a 1904 French silent trick film by Georges Méliès. It was sold by Méliès's Star Film Company and is numbered 547–549 in its catalogues, where it was advertised as a scène merveilleuse et comique ("comical and marvelous scene").

== Plot ==
A magician dressed as a Renaissance-era lord makes a cone out of a sheet of paper, summons six live rabbits from it, and puts them in a large empty trunk. From the trunk he then takes two women. The trunk briefly fades away to reveal a third woman, then returns to its place. The magician himself then pops out of the trunk.

Next he leads the two original women back into the trunk, stands it on its end, and opens it to reveal two male footmen. The magician and footmen stand on the trunk and become the two women, while the three men pop out of the trunk underneath them. All four of the magician's assistants pile into the trunk, which the magician attempts to carry. The trunk seems to flatten the magician, but he emerges from inside it unharmed, and all return for a curtain call.

== Production ==
Méliès himself is the magician in the film. It is based on a classic stage magic act, with additions made possible using the special effects techniques of the substitution splice, the multiple exposure, and the dissolve.
