= The One-Man Band =

The One Man Band
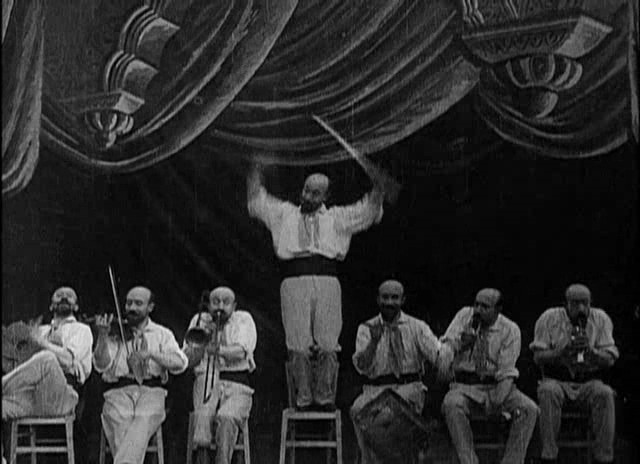
- A frame from the film
- Directed by: Georges Méliès
- Starring: Georges Méliès
- Release date: 1900
- Running time: 40 meters (approx. 1.5 minutes)
- Country: France
- Language: Silent film

The One-Man Band

The One Man Band (French: L'Homme-Orchestre) is a 1900 French silent trick film directed by Georges Méliès. It was released by Méliès's Star Film Company and is numbered 262–263 in its catalogs.

== Synopsis ==
On an empty stage, a magician (Méliès) multiplies himself and his chair to form an instrumental band, which he conducts in a lively piece of music. He then returns to each of his identical copies, and a giant ornamental fan appears behind him. Jumping up, the magician disappears in a puff of smoke before returning to the stage for a final bow.

== Production ==
To create the illusion of seven identical musicians, the film required seven simultaneous multiple exposures; only one other known Méliès film, The Melomaniac, uses so many exposures at once. In addition, the effect required careful coordination in timing and body position between exposures. First, Méliès walked down a line, arranging the seven chairs in a row and sitting in the last one; then, the film was rewound in the camera six times to allow Méliès to play the part of each musician. While filming each musician's part, all other chairs were masked from the lens to prevent them from being exposed. The process was repeated until the entire band had been filmed, all on a single strip of film. In 1906, Méliès commented on the difficulty of multiple exposure: "you go into a rage when after three quarters of an hour of work and attention, a sprocket rips forcing you to start all over again, repair being impossible."

The other effects in the film were created with stage machinery, pyrotechnics, and the substitution splice. A similar effect had previously been created by Méliès in his 1898 film The Triple Lady, in which two copies of a woman emerge from her body and sit beside her. The theme of multiplying chairs returned in Méliès's later film The Black Imp, although that film uses no multiple exposures.

== Legacy ==
John Frazer, in his book-length study of Méliès, comments: "As a piece of theater this act is simple, but as cinema it is a Méliès tour de force, unchallenged for years."

In his 1921 film The Playhouse, Buster Keaton evoked a similar image by appearing as all nine members of a minstrel show. The effect was created using the same techniques Méliès had pioneered for The One Man Band and The Melomaniac.
