= The Cook's Revenge =

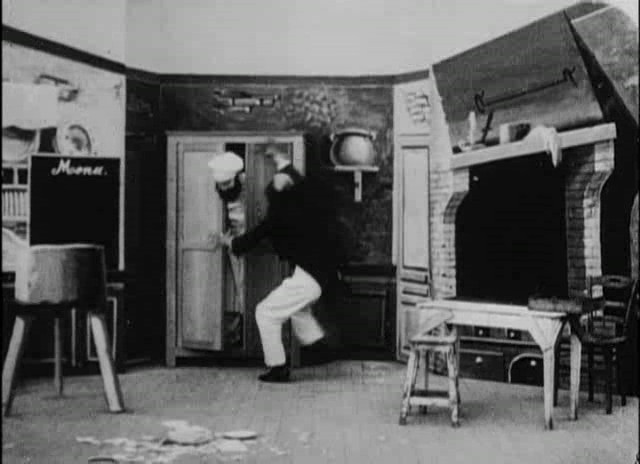
- A frame from the film
- Directed by: Georges Méliès
- Starring: Georges Méliès
- Production company: Star Film Company
- Release date: 1900
- Running time: Short
- Country: France
- Language: Silent film

The Cook's Revenge (French: La Vengeance du gâte-sauce) is a 1900 French silent trick film by Georges Méliès.

== Synopsis ==
The Cook's Revenge (1900)

In a kitchen, a cook attempts to kiss a waitress, and she drops a whole stack of plates in her surprise. The panicking cook, hearing the head waiter coming, hides in a cupboard. He sticks his head out to hear the waiter's remonstrances about the broken plates, and the waiter slams the cupboard door shut. The cook's head, still very much alive, comes off and begins berating the astonished chef.

The chef attempts to destroy the talking head, but it eludes him, magically changing places around the room. Finally the chef throws the head into the cupboard, and the cook comes out, again in one piece. As revenge, the cook knocks the waiter's head clean off, tosses the body aside, and cheerfully dances away.

== Production and survival ==
Méliès himself plays the cook, one of his many roles in which he loses his head or has several duplicate heads. The special effects are created with substitution splices and multiple exposures on a black background.

The Cook's Revenge was released by Méliès's Star Film Company and is numbered 243 in its catalogues. Long presumed lost, a print of the film was eventually rediscovered in Manosque by the son of a fairground exhibitor, and sold to Méliès's granddaughter, Madeleine Malthête-Méliès.
