= Gulliver's Travels Among the Lilliputians and the Giants =

1902 French silent film by Georges Méliès

Le Voyage de Gulliver à Lilliput et chez les géants
- Le Voyage de Gulliver à Lilliput et chez les Géants, full film
- Directed by: Georges Méliès
- Based on: Gulliver's Travels by: Jonathan Swift
- Production companies: Georges Méliès; Star-Film
- Distributed by: Georges Méliès (1903); Star-Film (1902); American Mutoscope & Biograph (1903); Edison Manufacturing Company; Flicker Alley (2008, US-DVD)
- Release date: 1902
- Country: France
- Language: Silent film

Le Voyage de Gulliver à Lilliput et chez les Géants, released in the United States as Gulliver's Travels Among the Lilliputians and the Giants and in the United Kingdom as Gulliver's Travels—In the land of the Lilliputians and the Giants, is a 1902 French silent trick film directed by Georges Méliès, based on Jonathan Swift's 1726 novel Gulliver's Travels.

== Production ==
Méliès himself plays Gulliver in the film. The visual differences of scale between Gulliver and the countries he visits were created using multiple exposures and miniature models; Méliès uses substitution splices and careful exposure design to merge the various elements and give them a sense of apparently seamless action. Some scenes were filmed outdoors, in Méliès's garden in Montreuil, Seine-Saint-Denis, so that the camera could be far away enough from the Lilliputians to make them look small.

== Release and legacy ==
Gulliver's Travels Among the Lilliputians and the Giants was released by Méliès's Star Film Company and is numbered 426–429 in its catalogues. In early 1903, the Edison Manufacturing Company sold duplicated prints of Gulliver's Travels Among the Lilliputians and the Giants, as well as of Méliès's other films Joan of Arc and Robinson Crusoe, in the United States. Siegmund Lubin also advertised a Gulliver's Travels film in 1903; this may have been an attempt by Lubin to ride on the popularity of Méliès's version.

In 1988, Jean-Pierre Mocky directed Gulliver, a three-minute remake of Méliès's film, as part of the TF1 television program Méliès 88. At the time, the film was one of 158 Méliès films presumed lost, but for which written scenarios survived; Mocky based his remake on Méliès's original scenario, but used a style and tone markedly different from Méliès's works.

A stencil-colored print of the film is held at the Cineteca di Milano. It is unknown whether Méliès authorized the coloring, as the stencil process is highly unusual in his oeuvre; normally, his films were colored using an entirely freehand method supervised by the colorist Elisabeth Thuillier.

Flicker Alley released the film on DVD in the US in 2008.

== Reception ==
In their study of film adaptations of British literature, Gregory M. Colón Semenza and Robert J. Hasenfratz called Gulliver's Travels Among the Lilliputians and the Giants a "gorgeous film" that "remains very watchable due to its sheer imaginative and visual invention".
