= The Fugitive Apparitions =

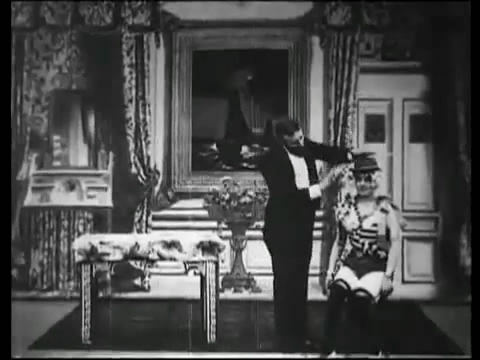
- A frame from the film
- Directed by: Georges Méliès
- Starring: Georges Méliès
- Production company: Star Film Company
- Release date: 1904
- Country: France
- Language: Silent

Les Apparitions fugitives, sold in the United States as The Fugitive Apparitions and in Britain as Short Lived Apparitions, is a 1904 French silent trick film by Georges Méliès. It was sold by Méliès's Star Film Company and is numbered 550–551 in its catalogues.

Méliès plays the magician in the film, which uses substitution splices, dissolves, and multiple exposures to create its special effects. A paper print of the film survives at the Library of Congress.
