= The Spider and the Butterfly =

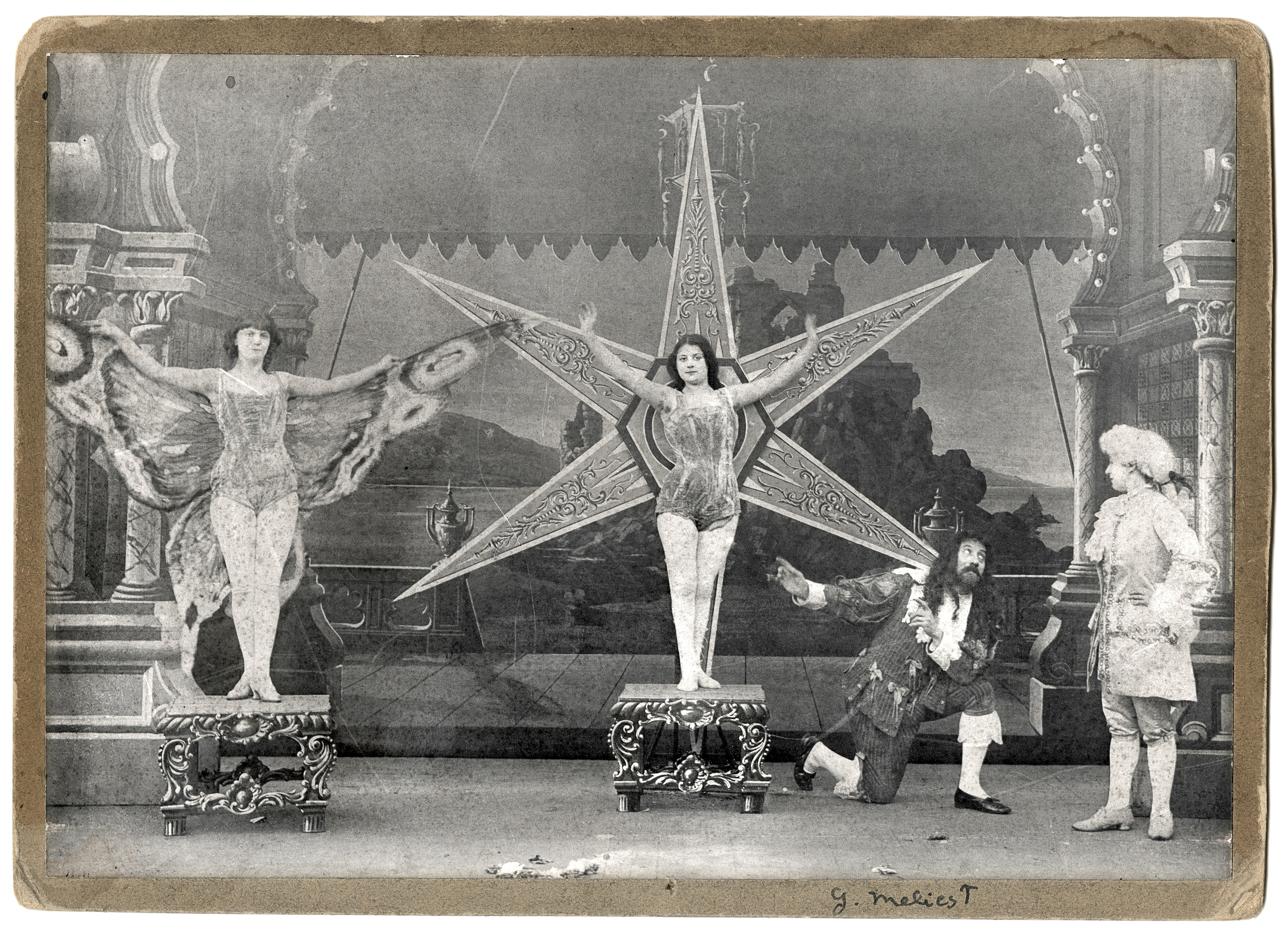
- Production still from the film
- Directed by: Georges Méliès
- Starring: Georges Méliès
- Production company: Star Film Company
- Release date: 1909
- Running time: 80 meters
- Country: France
- Language: Silent

The Spider and the Butterfly (French: Papillon fantastique) is a 1909 French silent trick film directed by Georges Méliès.

== Production ==
Méliès plays the magician in the film.

== Release and survival ==
The Spider and the Butterfly was released by Méliès's Star Film Company, and is numbered 1530–1533 in its catalogues.

The end of Méliès's filmmaking career was marked by mounting financial difficulties, forcing him eventually to close his studio. In 1923, Méliès discarded his collection of negative and positive prints for his films. After living forgotten and in poverty for some years, Méliès was rediscovered by film devotées in the late 1920s. On 16 December 1929, a "Gala Méliès" was held at the Salle Pleyel in Paris, reintroducing Méliès and his work to posterity.

The Gala Méliès included projection of eight Méliès films that had managed to be recovered, including The Spider and the Butterfly (the others were Whimsical Illusions, The Diabolic Tenant, The Wandering Jew, A Trip to the Moon, Baron Munchausen's Dream, The Merry Frolics of Satan, and The Conquest of the Pole). After the Gala, the print of The Spider and the Butterfly went missing once again; it was presumed lost as of 2008. A fragment of the film was rediscovered in time to be included in a 2010 DVD collection of some of Méliès's films.
