= The Famous Box Trick =

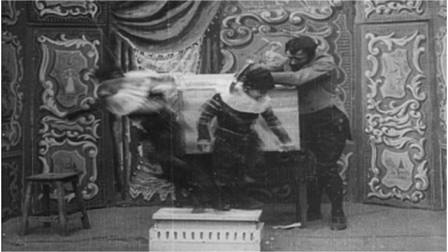
- A frame from the film
- Directed by: Georges Méliès
- Starring: Georges Méliès
- Release date: 1898
- Running time: Approx. 70 seconds
- Country: France
- Language: Silent

The Famous Box Trick (French: Illusions fantasmagoriques) is an 1898 French silent trick film, directed by Georges Méliès, featuring a stage magician who transforms one boy into two with the aid of an axe.

== Synopsis ==
The Famous Box Trick (1898)

A stage magician conjures up a dove and places it in a box with a set of clothes. A boy appears from the box, and the magician divides him into two boys with an axe. The two boys squabble, and the magician transforms one into a paper tissue, which he shreds and places the other back in the box. The magician then destroys the box with a hammer to show the boy has vanished. The boy reappears and is transformed into flags. The magician then disappears in a puff of smoke, only to re-enter through a door to take his bow.

== Production ==
At the time of filming The Famous Box Trick, Méliès had recently finished a series of complex "reconstructed newsreels" (staged recreations of current events) about the Spanish–American War. He then moved back towards trick films with this film and a handful of others, short magical sketches focusing on special effects made with variations of the substitution splice. The Famous Box Trick, with ten substitution splices in a single minute of action, may be the most complex of this group and the most technically complicated of any film Méliès had made so far.

Méliès plays the magician in the film, which also uses pyrotechnics in its effects. The style is highly theatrical, with camera tricks only beginning around halfway through, and particularly reminiscent of Méliès's earlier The Vanishing Lady (1896). The film's use of American and British flags as props reflects international interest in Méliès's films; by 1898, Méliès had found the United States and United Kingdom to be important markets for his work.

== Release ==
The film was sold by Méliès's Star Film Company and is numbered 155 in its catalogues. A print survives at the British Film Institute.
