= The Drawing Lesson =

1903 film by Georges Méliès

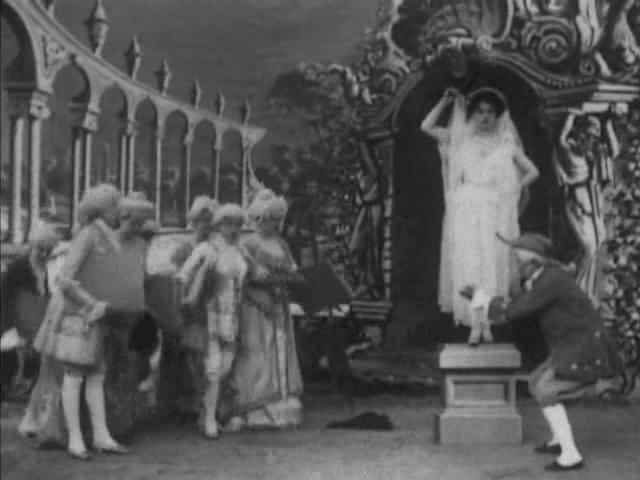
- A scene from the film
- Directed by: Georges Méliès
- Starring: Georges Méliès
- Production company: Star Film Company
- Release date: 1903
- Country: France
- Language: Silent

The Drawing Lesson, or the Living Statue (French: La Statue animée) is a 1903 French silent trick film by Georges Méliès. It was sold by Méliès's Star Film Company and is numbered 470–471 in its catalogues, where it was advertised as a scène Louis XV à trucs ("Louis XV-era scene with trick effects").

== Plot ==
A surviving print of the film

In an ornate outdoor scene, a painter comes upon a decorated sculptural niche with a small fountain. Admiring the view, he sets up his easel and goes off to collect his art students. A moment later, a merry prankster comes upon the scene, and begins doing magical tricks, turning a barrel into a pedestal, a ball into a miniature sun, the sun into a woman's head, and a handkerchief and jacket into her dress. Soon, in front of the niche, he has completed a statue of a woman in classical garb.

The painter and his students return, and are pleasantly surprised to find the statue there. As the painter bustles around the woman, she comes to life and steals the hat from his head. Then she transforms into an enormous fountain, into which the laughing prankster douses the painter.

== Production ==
Méliès plays the prankster in the film, which uses a wide range of special effects, including substitution splices, multiple exposures on a black background, dissolves, and a cascade of real water. Méliès reused the motifs of the sun and the woman's head in his film Alcofrisbas, the Master Magician later that year.
