= The Brahmin and the Butterfly =

1901 French short silent fantasy film by Georges Méliès

La Chrysalide et le Papillon d'or
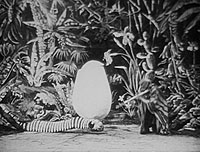
- Directed by: Georges Méliès
- Starring: Georges Méliès
- Release date: 1901
- Running time: 2min
- Country: France
- Language: Silent

The Brahmin and the Butterfly (French: La Chrysalide et le Papillon d'or, literally "The Chrysalis and the Golden Butterfly") is a 1901 French silent fantasy trick film, directed by Georges Méliès.

== Synopsis ==
The Brahmin and the Butterfly (1901)

A Brahmin, playing the flute in a rainforest, lures a large caterpillar toward him. The caterpillar is placed in a cocoon, from which it emerges as a woman-butterfly. Infatuated, the Brahmin tries to capture her with a blanket; when she reappears from inside the blanket, she has turned into a princess. When the Brahmin attempts to kiss her, the princess transforms him into the caterpillar.

== Production and themes ==
The Brahmin and the Butterfly was inspired by Buatier de Kolta's 1885 magic act Le Cocon, ou Le Ver à Soie. In the act, de Kolta drew a silkworm on paper; the paper broke to reveal a cocoon, which opened to reveal de Kolta's wife dressed as a butterfly. Méliès's film maintains the links to the myth of Pygmalion and Galatea, a theme beloved of stage magicians, but gives it a new comic twist. The ending of the film makes it unusual among Méliès's oeuvre: where usually his male characters lead the action and his female characters are reduced to supporting roles, here the butterfly-princess seizes control of the story and wins out over Méliès's own character.

Méliès appears in the film as the Brahmin. The effects for the film were created using stage machinery and substitution splices.

== Release and reception ==
The Brahmin and the Butterfly was released by Méliès's Star Film Company and is listed as numbers 332–333 in its catalogues. Like many of Méliès's films, it was sold both in black-and-white and in a version hand-colored by the studio of Elisabeth Thuillier. The film survives only in black-and-white; in 1979, the film scholar Jacques Malthête recreated the hand-colored version using historically authentic technology, applying eight color tones to a black-and-white print.

The film was screened in 2000 at the Pordenone Silent Film Festival in Italy. The film scholar Paolo Cherchi Usai contributed a one-sentence program note: "The most beautiful love story of early cinema!"
