= Whimsical Illusions =

- Directed by: Georges Méliès
- Starring: Georges Méliès; Manuel
- Production company: Star Film Company
- Release date: 1909
- Country: France
- Language: Silent

Whimsical Illusions (French: Les Illusions fantaisistes) is a 1909 French silent trick film directed by Georges Méliès.

== Production ==
Méliès appears in the film as the magician, with the actor Manuel as his assistant. Special effects in the film were created using stage machinery and substitution splices.

The film includes magic tricks Méliès had previously performed live on stage at his Paris theatre of illusions, the Théâtre Robert-Houdin: one in which giant playing-cards come from a display stand, and one in which a head comes out of a crate and chases the magician around the stage. (This latter stage illusion was created by Méliès as "Le décapité recalcitrant" in 1891, with the head being that of a talkative pedant, Professor Barbenfouillis.)

== Release and survival ==
The film was released in 1909 by Méliès's Star Film Company and is numbered 1508–1512 in its catalogues. A surviving print of the film was rediscovered in the 1920s by Jean P. Mauclaire, director of the French art house cinema Studio 28. (The print was one of a batch of Méliès films that had been owned by and shown at the Grands Magasins Dufayel department store in Paris, and which had then been stored at the Château de Jeufosse in Normandy, where Mauclaire came across them.) Mauclaire exhibited the film as part of the Gala Méliès at the Salle Pleyel on 16 December 1929.

The surviving print of the film is hand-colored, but it is unclear when the coloring was done; the Gala Méliès program identified the print as an original copy, but it is known that some prints shown at the Gala were hand-colored in 1929 specifically for that event. One legend claims that the 1929 coloring was done by Berthe Thuillier, an artist who had collaborated prolifically with Méliès on film colorization at the turn of the century. However, this was disproved in an interview with Thuillier herself in the journal Le Nouvel Art Cinématographique (volume 5, January 1930, page 74).
