= A Terrible Night =

1896 film directed by Georges Méliès

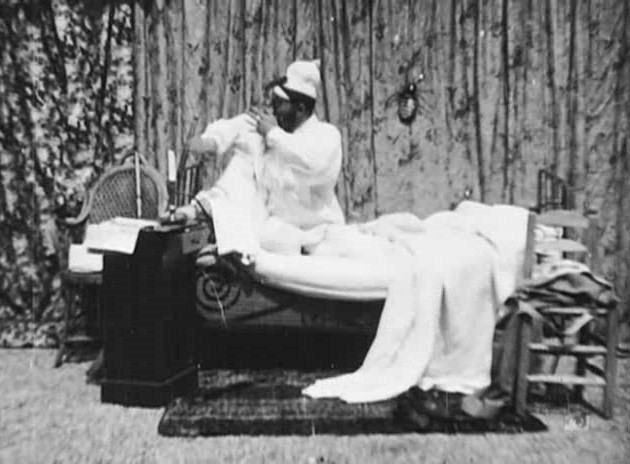
- Scene from the common version of the film
- Directed by: Georges Méliès
- Produced by: Georges Méliès
- Release date: 1896
- Country: France
- Language: Silent

A Terrible Night (French: Une nuit terrible) is an 1896 French silent comic trick film by Georges Méliès, who is also the actor in the film. It was released by Méliès's Star Film Company and is numbered 26 in its catalogues, where it is listed with the descriptive subtitle scène comique.

== Synopsis ==
A Terrible Night (1896)

A man tries to go to sleep, but is disturbed by a giant bug climbing up the bed and onto the wall. He attacks the bug with a broom and disposes of it in a chamber pot in a compartment of his bedside table.

== Production ==
A Terrible Night may have been inspired by a series of comic magic lantern slides, published in the 1880s by the English firm of Bamforth & Co Ltd. The film predates Méliès's famous use of cinematic special effects; the first known Méliès film with camera effects is The Vanishing Lady, made later in 1896. Rather, the giant bug is a simple pasteboard prop controlled with wire.

The film was made with the Méliès-Reulos portable camera in the open air, in the garden of Méliès's home in Montreuil, using natural sunlight and a cloth backdrop. Méliès himself played the man attempting to sleep.

== Survival ==
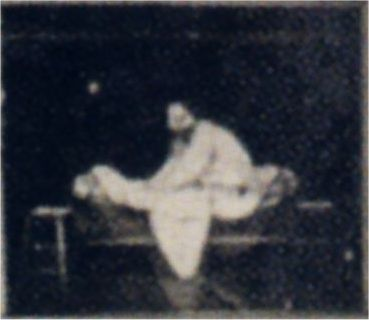
Frame from the film suspected to be the original A Terrible Night

A film commonly identified as A Terrible Night is known to survive and has appeared on various DVD collections. However, Méliès's great-great-granddaughter, Pauline Méliès, published findings in 2013 suggesting that the film commonly believed to be A Terrible Night is actually a later Méliès film, A Midnight Episode, numbered 190 in the Star Films catalogues, and that the original A Terrible Night—featuring simpler scenery and different camera placement, but the same plot and the same bed—survives in two print copies: a photocollage held by the Cinémathèque Française and a flipbook published by Lèon Beaulieu around the turn of the century. If this hypothesis is accurate, both A Terrible Night and A Midnight Episode survive.

== Public domain ==
The film is in the public domain in the United States because it was published before January 1, 1931, and all works published in the US before that date are now public domain. It is also in the public domain in France and other countries where copyright lasts for the life of the author plus 70 years, as Méliès died in 1938, making the copyright expire in 2009.
