= The Cave of the Demons =

The Accursed Cave
- Directed by: Georges Méliès
- Produced by: Georges Méliès
- Production company: Star Film Company
- Release date: 1898
- Running time: 20 meters
- Country: France
- Language: Silent

The Accursed Cave (French: La Caverne maudite) is an 1898 French silent trick film directed by Georges Méliès.

The film was one of Méliès's early forays into themes that would later be linked to horror cinema (his The Haunted Castle, made in 1896, is sometimes labeled the first horror film). The Cave of the Demons is also believed to be the first film in which Méliès used the cinematic technique of multiple exposure.

The film was released by Méliès's Star Film Company and is numbered 164 in its catalogues. It is currently presumed lost.

== See also ==
- List of ghost films
