= Rip's Dream =

- The colorised film
- Directed by: Georges Méliès
- Written by: Georges Méliès
- Based on: Rip Van Winkle by Washington Irving
- Produced by: Georges Méliès
- Starring: Georges Méliès
- Production company: Star Film Company
- Release date: 1905
- Running time: 14 minutes
- Country: France
- Language: Silent

Rip's Dream (French: La Légende de Rip Van Vinckle [sic]) is a 1905 French silent film directed by Georges Méliès.

== Production ==
Rip's Dream is based on two sources: the original 1819 "Rip Van Winkle" story by Washington Irving, and the 1882 operetta version of Rip Van Winkle (with music by Robert Planquette and libretto by Henri Meilhac, Philippe Gille, and Henry Brougham Farnie). Two elements, the mysterious snake and the village idiot, are Méliès's own creations.

Méliès himself plays Rip. His son André appears as a village child carrying a large lantern. (Rip's friends' lanterns are in fact Bastille Day celebratory lanterns with the initials RF, for République française, clearly marked upon them.)

Like many of Méliès's films made around 1905, Rip's Dream revels in theatricality. While some of Méliès's earlier major films, such as The Impossible Voyage and The Kingdom of the Fairies, had experimented with innovative cinematic continuity techniques, these later films are based fully upon the storytelling traditions of the stage. According to recollections by André Méliès, the snake was a "gadget" his father had brought back from England, worked by wires and springs. The snake scene was done on a raked stage to allow the gadget's movements to be seen more clearly. Some of the ghosts in the dream sequence are actors wearing white sheets; others are silhouettes cut out of cardboard. Other effects in the film were created using stage machinery, substitution splices, and dissolves.

== Release and reception ==
The film was released by Méliès's Star Film Company and numbered 756–775 in its catalogues, where it was described as a grande pièce fantastique en 17 tableaux. For Méliès's more complex films, it was expected that a summary of the action, known as a boniment, would be read aloud during projection to help viewers follow the plot. A boniment published by Méliès in 1905 for Rip's Dream survives in the archives of the Cinémathèque Française.

A 1981 Méliès study produced by the Centre national du cinéma highlighted the carefully introduced and constructed dream sequence in the film, and added that Méliès's invention of the village idiot character allows the film to move from reality to dream and back in a fluid and balanced way. Cultural historian Richard Abel called the film a "colorful forest fantasy," highlighting its overt theatricality and strong roots to the Planquette operetta. Writer and historian Thomas S. Hischak, reviewing the film's spectacular effects and deviations from Irving's original tale, concluded: "As an adaptation the movie is nonsense … but for film historians it is remarkable."
