= The Christmas Dream =

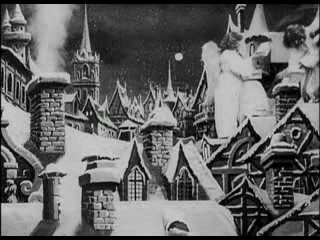
- A scene from the film
- Directed by: Georges Méliès
- Production company: Star Film Company
- Release date: 1900
- Running time: 70 meters/230 feet (3.5 minutes at 18 fps)
- Country: France
- Language: Silent

The Christmas Dream (French: Le Rêve de Noël) is a 1900 French silent Christmas-themed trick film directed by Georges Méliès. It was released by Méliès's Star Film Company and is numbered 298–305 in its catalogues, where it was advertised as a féerie cinématographique à grand spectacle en 20 tableaux.

== Synopsis ==
The Christmas Dream (1900)

In a richly decorated bedroom, two children are tucked into bed by an older woman, who then sits at a bedside table and begins to read. What follows is a series of images and vignettes related to the Christmas season.

First is a fantastical landscape full of toys. A wizard in a crown and long robes supervises Christmas boxes being sent out. When he leaves, the scene is filled by a parade and a dance of dolls, led by a jester-like Pulcinella. As the dance grows into joyful pandemonium, the wizard rushes on in great annoyance and makes an attempt to restore calm.

Next, on the roofs of an old village, snow falls as angels distribute boxes. The scene shifts to the entrance of a Catholic church, where young bell-ringers are pulling their bell ropes and congregants are arriving from the snow for Mass. At the top of the belfry, a huge bell rings. Outside in the dark street, attendants with lanterns show the way into the church. At a sumptuous feast, a beggar is let in and given a seat at the table.

The scene returns to the bedroom. It is Christmas morning, and the children awake to find presents waiting for them at the fireplace. The adults of the family arrive to greet the children. Finally, in a winter landscape with snow and icebergs, dancers celebrate the season and children marvel at a huge Christmas tree.

== Production and themes ==
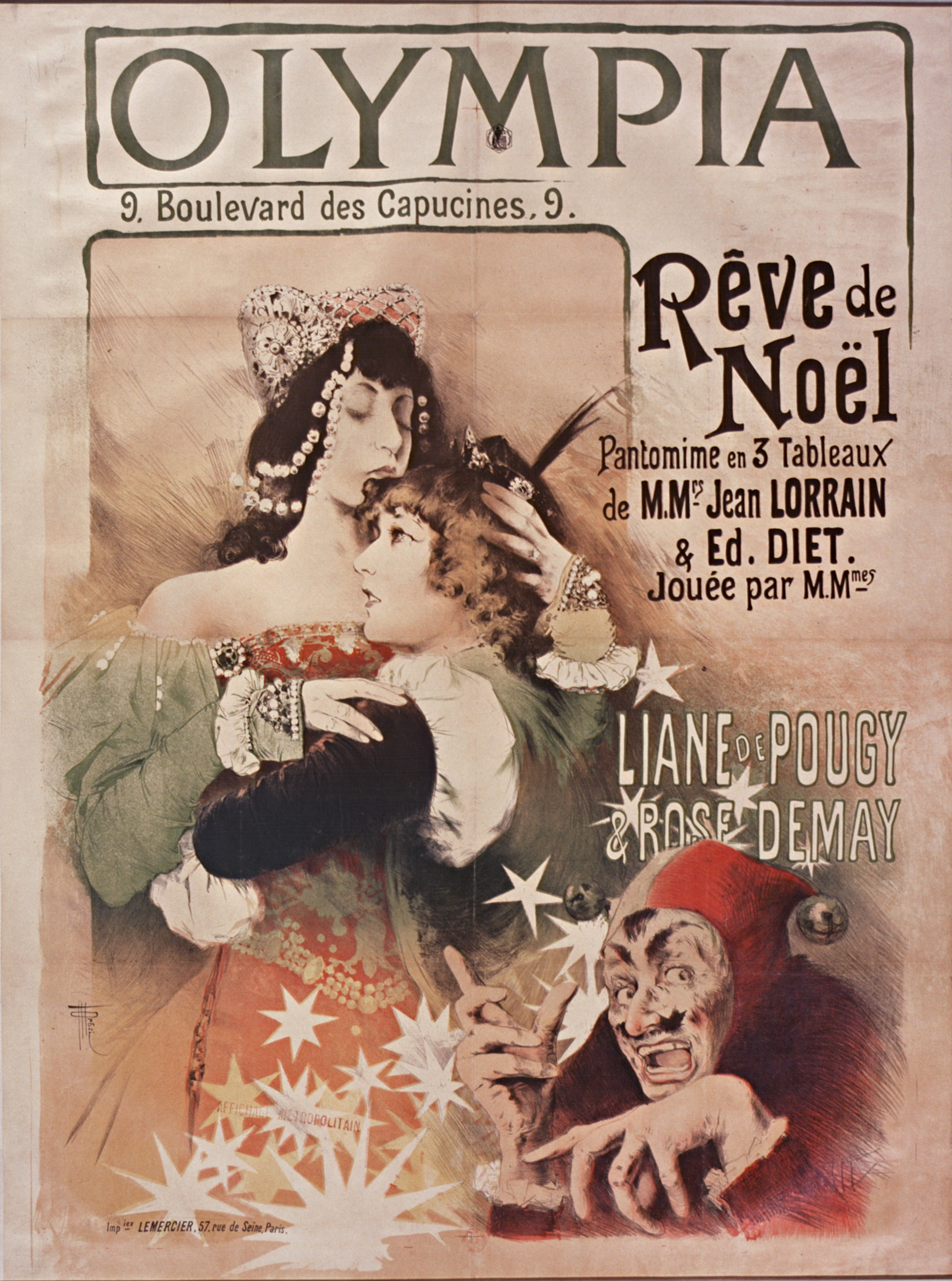
Poster for the 1896 stage production that may have inspired the film

The film, one of Méliès's cinematic contributions to the féerie genre, may have been inspired by a stage production of the same name, produced in 1896 at the Olympia music hall in Paris. The film's structure is highly theatrical, alternating familiar genre scenes with fantasy elements in the manner of a stage féerie; the sequence with the hungry poor in the streets calls back to scenes from nineteenth-century melodrama.

Méliès appears in The Christmas Dream twice, as the wizard and as the beggar. The film includes symbols derived from the Christian tradition, including a sheep and a lion, as well as a motif emblematic of Méliès himself: a jester. The long and (for Méliès) unusually serene shot of a church bell ringing also functions as a symbol; it can be read as a communal ritual of peace, seen through a gently nostalgic lens.

The production style is eclectic and theatrical, with a mix of clothing styles from several different eras and stylistic juxtapositions such as live pigeons in the same frame as a flat, painted cutout church bell. However, the film also includes more in-depth diagonal staging, realistically painted scenery, and naturalistic acting than is usual in Méliès's major productions.

Special effects used in the film include stage machinery (for the church bell and the Christmas tree that opens up), substitution splices, and dissolves, which are used partially to help connect adjacent spaces, such as the inside of a church followed by the inside of its bell tower. Méliès, one of the first filmmakers to use dissolves as a connecting transition, was likely inspired by the smooth scene changes in theatrical melodramas, which often used lighting, stage machinery, and other effects to flow continuously from one scene to another without dropping a curtain. The scene arrangement and staging combine to give a sense of dynamic, free-flowing movement, helping build a coherent atmosphere for the film's urban spaces.

== Survival ==
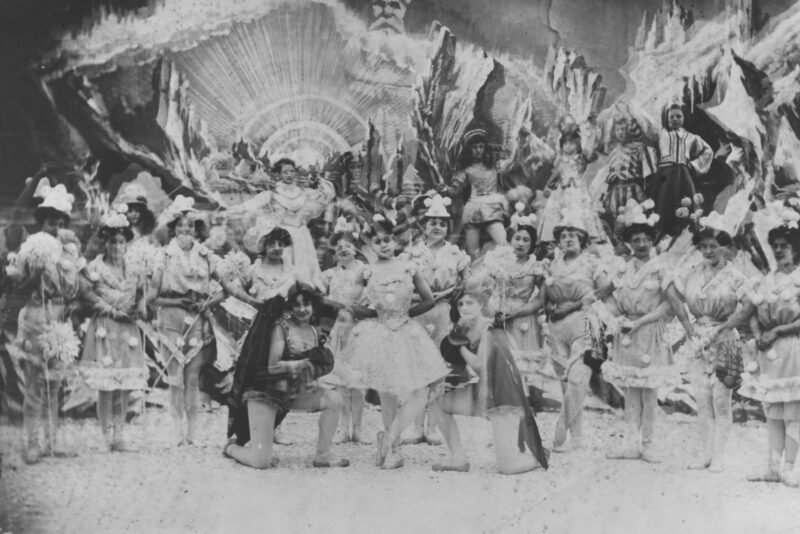
A lost scene from the film

An incomplete print of The Christmas Dream, structured differently from Méliès's catalogue description and seemingly missing about 20 feet of film, survives at the British Film Institute in London. It was released to home video in the 2000s, still incomplete. In a 1979 study, another print of the film was believed to survive in a private collection, but was unavailable for viewing at the time.

== See also ==
- List of Christmas films
