= The Melomaniac =

Le Mélomane
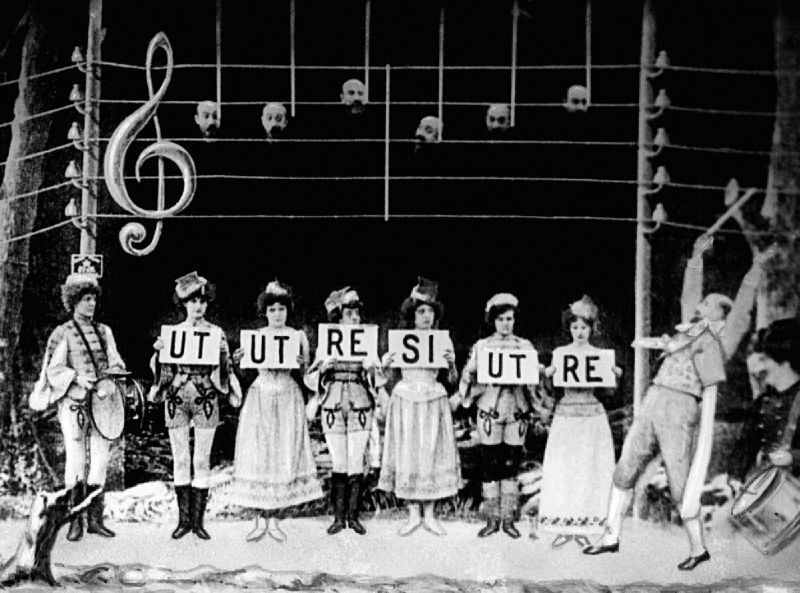
- Directed by: Georges Méliès
- Starring: Georges Méliès
- Production company: Star Film Company
- Release date: 1903
- Running time: 50 meters
- Country: France
- Language: Silent

The Melomaniac (French: Le Mélomane) is a 1903 French silent trick film directed by Georges Méliès.

== Plot ==
The Melomaniac (1903)

A music master leads his band to a field where five telegraph lines are strung on utility poles. Hoisting up a giant treble clef, he turns the set of lines into a giant musical staff. He then uses copies of his own head to spell out the tune for "God Save the King," and his band joins in.

== Production and release ==
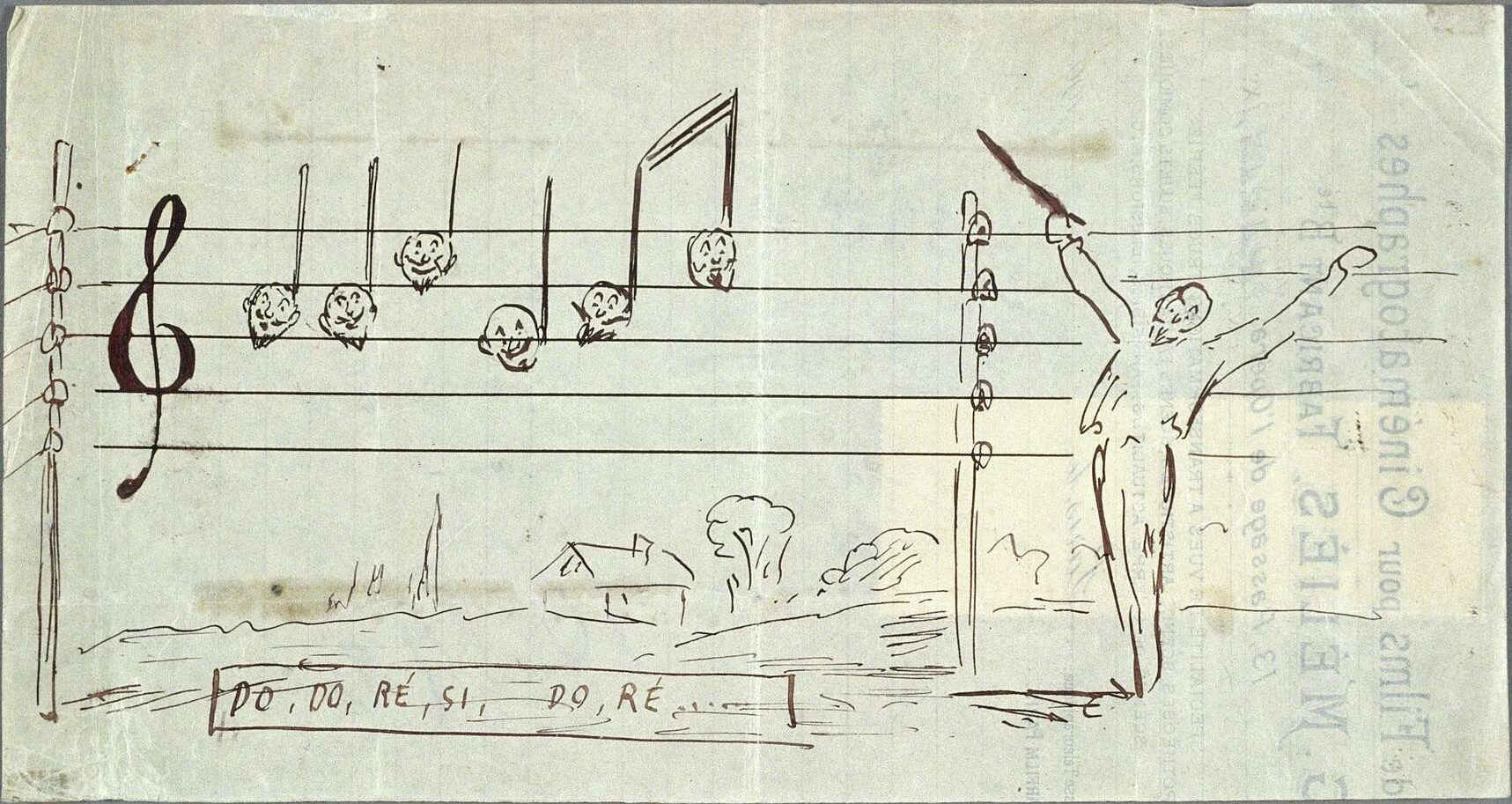
Preliminary sketch by Georges Méliès for the film, on the back of some company paperwork

Méliès himself plays the lead role of the music master. The superimposition effects in The Mélomaniac, allowing multiple Méliès heads to appear on the staff, were created by a multiple exposure technique requiring the same strip of film to be run through the camera seven times. The rest of the film's special effects were created with substitution splices.

The film was released by Méliès's Star Film Company and is numbered 479–480 in its catalogues. The film was registered for American copyright at the Library of Congress on 30 June 1903.

The French film scholars Jacques Malthête and Laurent Mannoni believe The Mélomaniac to be Méliès's most famous trick film, and a Méliès guide from the Centre national de la cinématographie judges that the film merits that position. Film critic William B. Parrill rates it "innovative and creative".
