= Ten Ladies in One Umbrella =

- Directed by: Georges Méliès
- Starring: Georges Méliès
- Production company: Star Film Company
- Release date: 1903
- Country: France
- Language: Silent

La Parapluie fantastique, known in English as Ten Ladies in One Umbrella, Ten Girls in One Umbrella, and Ten Ladies in an Umbrella, is a 1903 French silent trick film by Georges Méliès.

== Production and themes ==
Méliès plays the magician in the film, the special effects for which were achieved using substitution splices and dissolves.

The film is strongly influenced by the Pygmalion myth, as is suggested by the inscription "Galathea Théâtre" on the set and various classical motifs, including Grecian costumes, classical musical instruments such as the auloi and the lyre, and a backdrop showing a classical landscape with a tempietto. Classical scholar Martin M. Winkler concludes: "Méliès the filmmaker-wizard-creator is evidently a modern Pygmalion."

== Release ==
The film was sold by Méliès's Star Film Company and is numbered 506–507 in its catalogues. In America, the film was sold as Ten Ladies in One Umbrella; in Britain, the title was Ten Girls in One Umbrella. The variant title Ten Ladies in an Umbrella was used for David Shepard's 2008 restoration of the film. A paper print of the film survives at the Library of Congress.
