= Robbing Cleopatra's Tomb =

Cléopâtre
- Directed by: Georges Méliès
- Written by: Georges Méliès
- Produced by: Georges Méliès
- Starring: Georges Méliès; Jeanne d'Alcy
- Cinematography: Georges Méliès
- Release date: 1899
- Running time: 2 minutes
- Country: France
- Language: Silent film

Robbing Cleopatra's Tomb (French: Cléopâtre, literally Cleopatra) is an 1899 silent trick film directed by Georges Méliès. One of the earliest horror films ever made, it is about resurrecting the mummy of Cleopatra. In it, a man chops the mummy of Cleopatra into pieces, and then "produces a woman from a smoking brazier."

While today director Méliès is more known for his iconic film A Trip to the Moon, it was this film which caught the attention of producer Charles Urban, who released the film in the United States (under the title Robbing Cleopatra's Tomb; its British release was simply titled Cleopatra's Tomb) and subsequently distributed many of Méliès other films. It is numbered 175–176 in the Méliès catalogue.

The film was considered a lost film; however a print was reported to have been discovered in France on 22 September 2005, despite the IMdB page of the short mentioning the discovered film was in fact a different Méliès film involving tomb robbery, The Oracle of Delphi (1903).
