= The Vanishing Lady =

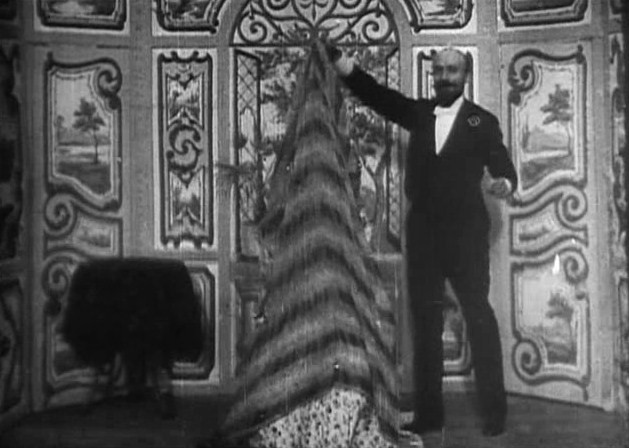
- A frame from the film
- Directed by: Georges Méliès
- Starring: Georges Méliès; Jehanne d'Alcy
- Production company: Star Film Company
- Release date: 1896
- Running time: Approx. 75 seconds
- Country: France
- Language: Silent

The Vanishing Lady (French: Escamotage d'une dame chez Robert-Houdin, literally "Magical Disappearance of a Lady at the Théâtre Robert-Houdin") is an 1896 French silent trick film directed by Georges Méliès. It features Méliès and Jehanne d'Alcy performing a trick in the manner of a stage illusion, in which D'Alcy disappears into thin air. A skeleton appears in her place before she finally returns for a curtain call.

The film, shot outdoors in Méliès's garden on a platform decorated with theatrical scenery, is based on a famous stage illusion by Buatier de Kolta, in which a woman disappeared by escaping through a hidden trapdoor. However, using an editing technique known as the substitution splice, Méliès carried out the trick using cinematic special effects rather than conventional stage machinery. The substitution splice also allowed Méliès to add new material to the end of the trick, inventing the appearance and transformation of the skeleton prop and D'Alcy's return. The film, notable as Méliès's first known use of cinematic special effects, survives in film archives; a hand-colored version has also been reconstructed by a Méliès scholar.

== Synopsis ==
Surviving print of the film

A magician walks onto a stage and brings out his assistant. He spreads a newspaper on the floor (thus demonstrating that no trap door is hidden there) and places a chair on top of it. He has his assistant sit in the chair, and spreads a shawl over her. When he removes the shawl, she has disappeared. He then waves his arms in the air and conjures up a skeleton. He places the shawl over the skeleton and removes it to reveal his assistant, alive and well.

== Production ==
The Vanishing Lady is based on a magic act by the French magician Buatier de Kolta. Méliès had already imitated the act onstage in his own venue, the Théâtre Robert-Houdin in Paris. When the illusion was produced onstage, stage machinery was used to make the magician's assistant disappear. The newspaper and shawl were crucial for the trick to work; the newspaper, actually a custom-made rubber prop, concealed a trapdoor on the stage floor, while the shawl covered the assistant during her "vanishing" into the trapdoor and out of sight. (The chair onstage was constructed with a breakaway seat, allowing the assistant to slide downwards behind the shawl, through a hidden flap in the rubber newspaper.)

In the filmed version, Méliès appears as the magician, and his assistant is Jehanne d'Alcy. D'Alcy, a performer at the Théâtre Robert-Houdin, had had much experience with the stage version of the illusion, in which her small stature was ideal for the escape down the trapdoor. The setting, seemingly an interior in Rococo style, was built of theatrical flats on a small outdoor platform Méliès had set up in his garden at Montreuil-sous-Bois.

The beginning of the film closely follows the Buatier de Kolta stage illusion, complete with the newspaper and shawl props. On film, however, Méliès needed no trapdoor, using instead an editing technique called the substitution splice—the first known instance of his using this effect. The substitution splice allowed Méliès and D'Alcy to cut directly from a shot of D'Alcy, seated in the chair under the shawl, to a shot where she was offscreen; between the two shots, Méliès held his position, creating the illusion of a magical disappearance. Méliès also took advantage of the substitution splice to expand the trick for the film, adding the transformation to and from a skeleton; the Buatier de Kolta stage illusion ended with the assistant's appearance.

Although he later claimed to have invented the technique independently, after his camera accidentally became jammed, Méliès probably developed the splice after seeing a rudimentary version in an 1895 Edison Manufacturing Company film The Execution of Mary Stuart. The Vanishing Lady is the first known use of the effect for magical as opposed to practical purposes, and the substitution splice became the most fundamental special effect in Méliès' oeuvre.

== Release ==
The Vanishing Lady was released by Méliès's Star Film Company and is numbered 70 in its catalogues. Though surviving prints of the film are in black-and-white, hand-colored prints of Méliès's films were also sold; the Méliès expert Jacques Malthête reconstructed a hand-colored version of the film in 1979, using authentic materials. In 2017, the Cinémathèque Française digitized their black-and-white 35 mm copy in 4K resolution.

== See also ==
- The Vanishing Lady (illusion)
