= The Diabolical Church Window =

1910 film by Georges Méliès

- Surviving fragment of the film
- Directed by: Georges Méliès
- Cinematography: Georgette Méliès
- Production company: Star Film Company
- Release date: 1911
- Country: France
- Language: Silent

The Diabolical Church Window (French: Le Vitrail diabolique) is a 1911 French short silent film by Georges Méliès. It was numbered 1548–1556 for the catalogues of Méliès's Star Film Company, but it was ultimately produced and distributed by Pathé Frères, who advertised it as with the subtitle magie vénitienne (Venetian magic).

Méliès's daughter, Georgette Méliès, is believed to have been one of the two camera operators for this and the other five Méliès films made in 1911–1912. Only a seven-minute portion of the film is currently known to survive; the rest is presumed lost.

== Works cited ==
- Malthête, Jacques; Mannoni, Laurent (2008), L'oeuvre de Georges Méliès, Paris: Éditions de La Martinière, ISBN 9782732437323
- Malthête, Jacques (2016), "Georgette Méliès", in Gaines, Jane; Vatsal, Radha; Dall'Asta, Monica (eds.), Women Film Pioneers Project, Center for Digital Research and Scholarship, Columbia University Libraries
