= Le Grand Méliès =

1952 film

- Directed by: Georges Franju
- Written by: Georges Franju
- Produced by: Fred Orain
- Starring: Jeanne d'Alcy
- Cinematography: Jacques Mercanton
- Edited by: Henri Schmitt
- Release date: 1952
- Running time: 31 minutes
- Country: France
- Language: French

Le Grand Méliès is a 1952 French short documentary film directed by Georges Franju about the life of the film pioneer Georges Méliès.

== Cast ==
- Jeanne d'Alcy as Herself
- François Lallement as Narrator (voice)
- André Méliès as Georges Méliès
- Marie-Georges Méliès as Herself / also voice: narrator
