= L'Omnibus des toqués ou Blancs et Noirs =

1901 film by Georges Méliès

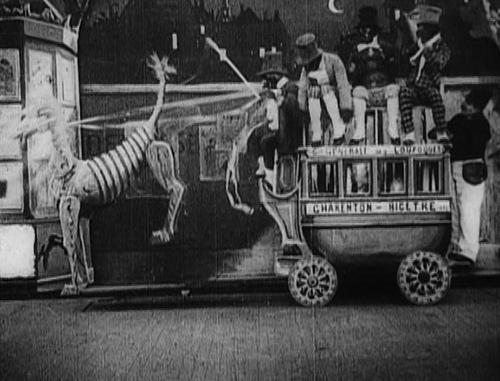
- Directed by: Georges Méliès
- Production company: Star Films
- Release date: 1901
- Running time: 1 minute
- Country: France
- Language: Silent

L'Omnibus des toqués ou Blancs et Noirs ("The Omnibus of Crazy People or Whites and Blacks") is a 1901 French film by Georges Méliès produced by Star Films. It is a science fiction-comedy running approximately one minute depicting clowns being taken to an asylum on a coach pulled by a mechanical horse that looks like a skeleton. After being back-kicked by the mechanical horse, the clowns escape and burn the coach, then give a brief performance in which slapping each other turns them black. This looks like blackface, but may be just intended as an inversion of the white clown make up. The clowns are absorbed into one, giving him a fat stomach, but he explodes. In the English-speaking world, names of well known asylums were included in alternate titles, including Off to Bedlam in Britain and Off to Bloomingdale Asylum in the United States.

The mechanical horse is powered by steam. Phil Hardy credits the idea of mechanical horses to Edward S. Ellis in The Aurum Film Encyclopedia: Science Fiction, noting The Steam Man of the Prairies (1865) and calling it, along with Frank Reade and His Steam Men, Steam Horse, and Steam Team, stating that they were translated into French and popular among French schoolboys.
