= Jehanne d'Alcy =

French actress (1865–1956)

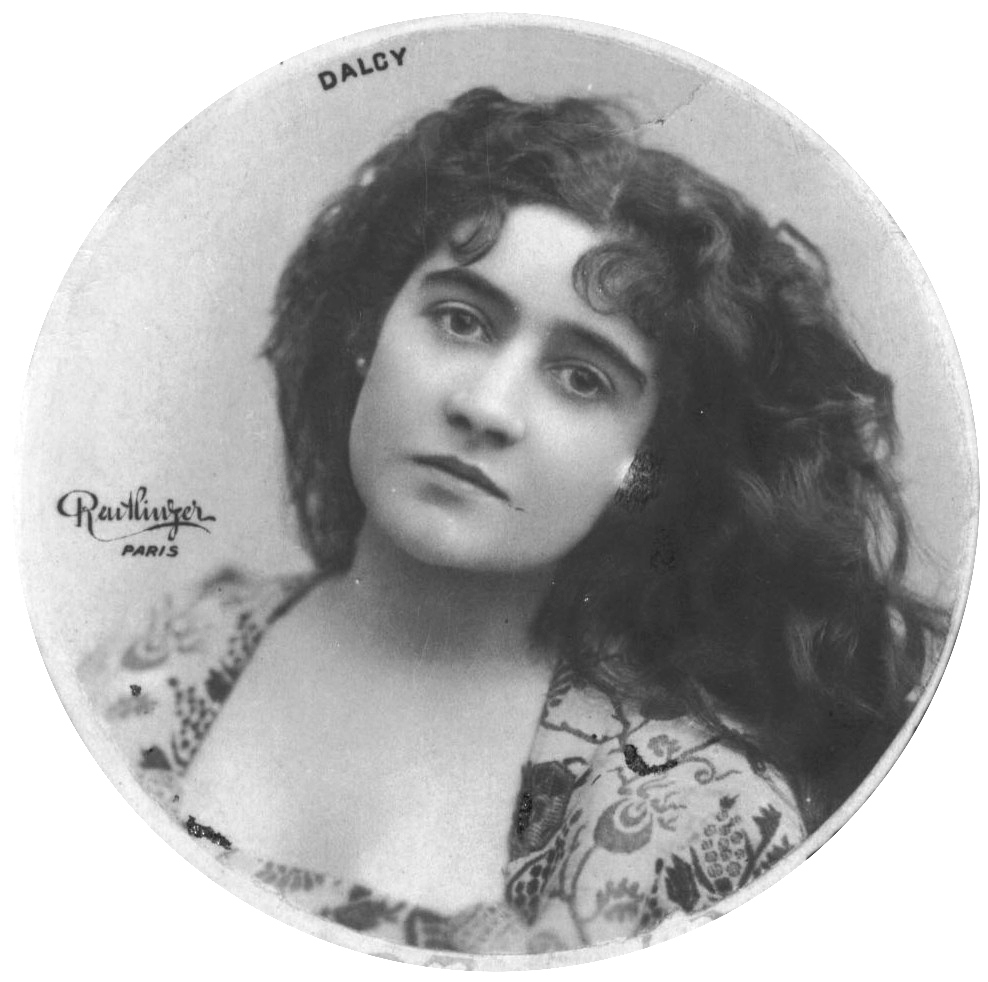
- Born: Charlotte Lucie Marie Adèle Stephanie Adrienne Faës; 20 March 1865; Vaujours, Seine-et-Oise, France
- Died: 14 October 1956 (aged 91); Versailles, France
- Occupation: Actress
- Years active: 1890–1956
- Spouse: Georges Méliès (m. 1925; died 1938)

Charlotte Lucie Marie Adèle Stephanie Adrienne Faës (20 March 1865 – 14 October 1956), known by her stage name Jeanne d'Alcy or Jehanne d'Alcy, was a French film actress. She is best known as being the mistress and eventual wife of French cinema pioneer, filmmaker and inventor Georges Méliès.

== Biography ==
D'Alcy had achieved success in theatrical productions by 1896, but left the stage to devote herself to film, becoming one of the first performers to do so.

Born in Vaujours, Seine-Saint-Denis, she appeared in Le Manoir du diable (1896), Jeanne d'Arc (1900) and Le Voyage dans la lune (1902). She was portrayed by actress Helen McCrory in Martin Scorsese's 2011 film Hugo.

She was the wife of Georges Méliès from 1925 until his death in 1938. D'Alcy died at the age of 91 in 1956. She is buried with her husband in the Père-Lachaise cemetery.

== Selected filmography ==
- Le Manoir du diable (1896)
- Escamotage d'une dame au théâtre Robert Houdin (1896) – Woman
- Après le bal (1897) – Woman
- Jeanne d'Arc (1899)
- Cendrillon (1899) – Fairy Godmother
- Cléopâtre (1899) – Cleopatre
- Barbe-bleue (1901) – Le nouvelle épouse de Barbe-bleue
- Le Voyage dans la lune (1902) (uncredited)
- Le Grand Méliès (1952) – herself

== Bibliography ==
- Herbert, Stephen. "Jehanne d'Alcy". Who's Who of Victorian Cinema.
