= The Execution of Mary, Queen of Scots (film) =

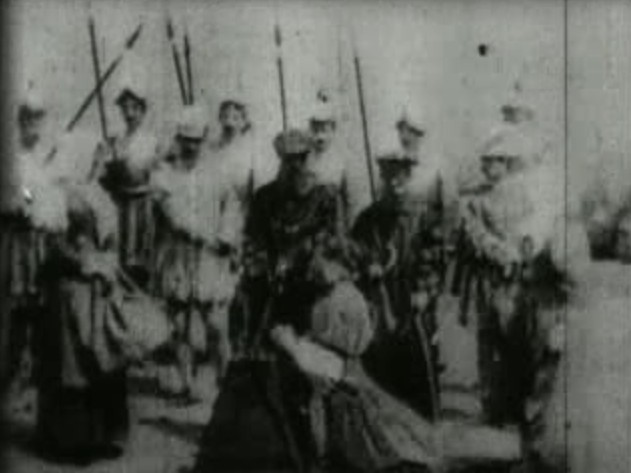
- Screen capture of a digitized version of the film
- Directed by: Alfred Clark
- Produced by: Thomas Edison
- Starring: Robert L. Thomas
- Cinematography: William Heise
- Distributed by: Edison Manufacturing Company
- Release date: August 28, 1895
- Running time: 18 seconds
- Country: United States
- Language: Silent film

The earliest known use of the stop trick.

The Execution of Mary, Queen of Scots is an American silent trick film produced in 1895. The film depicts the execution of Mary, Queen of Scots. It is the first known film to use special effects, specifically the stop trick.

== Production and content ==
The 18-second-long film was produced by Thomas Edison and directed by Alfred Clark and may have been the first film in history to use trained actors as well as the first to use editing for the purposes of special effects. The film shows a blindfolded Mary (played by Mrs. Robert L. Thomas) being led to the execution block. The executioner raises his axe and an edit occurs during which the actor is replaced by a mannequin. The mannequin's head is chopped off and the executioner holds it in the air as the film ends.

== See also ==
- List of horror films of the 1890s
