= Georges Méliès =

French filmmaker and illusionist (1861–1938)

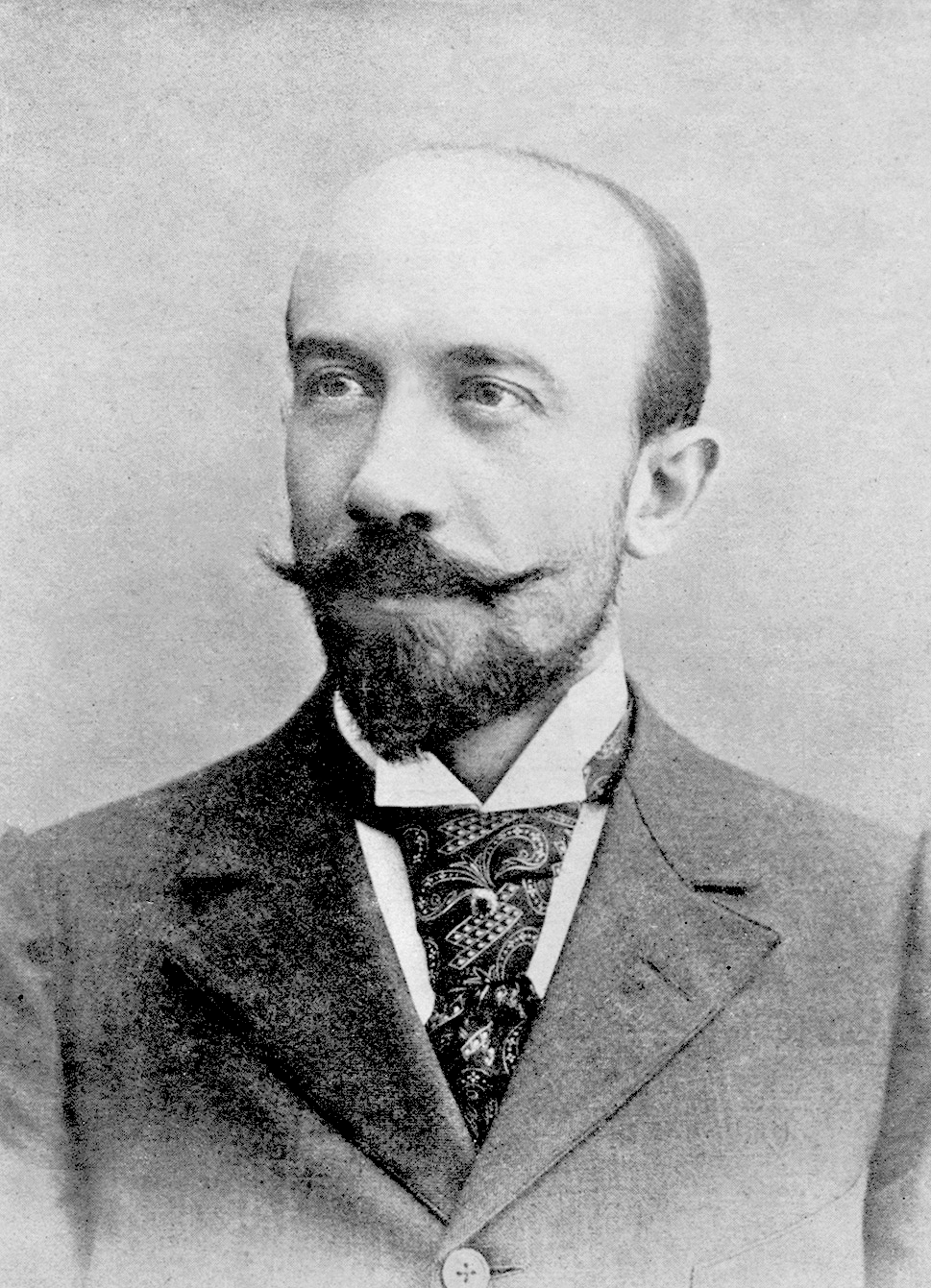
- Georges Méliès, c. 1890
- Born: Marie-Georges-Jean Méliès; 8 December 1861; Paris, France
- Died: 21 January 1938 (aged 76); Paris, France
- Resting place: Père Lachaise Cemetery
- Occupations: Filmmaker; actor; magician; toymaker
- Years active: 1888–1923
- Spouses: Eugénie Génin (m. 1885; died 1913) Jehanne D'Alcy (m. 1925)
- Children: 2

Marie-Georges-Jean Méliès (/meɪlˈjɛs/ mayl-YES, French: [maʁi ʒɔʁʒ ʒɑ̃ meljɛs]; 8 December 1861 – 21 January 1938) was a French filmmaker, actor, magician, and toymaker. He led many technical and narrative developments in the early days of cinema, primarily in the fantasy and science fiction genres. Méliès rose to prominence creating "trick films" and became well known for his innovative use of special effects, popularizing such techniques as substitution splices, multiple exposures, time-lapse photography, dissolves, and hand-painted colour. He was also one of the first filmmakers to use storyboards in his work. His most important films include A Trip to the Moon (1902) and The Impossible Voyage (1904).

== Early life and education ==
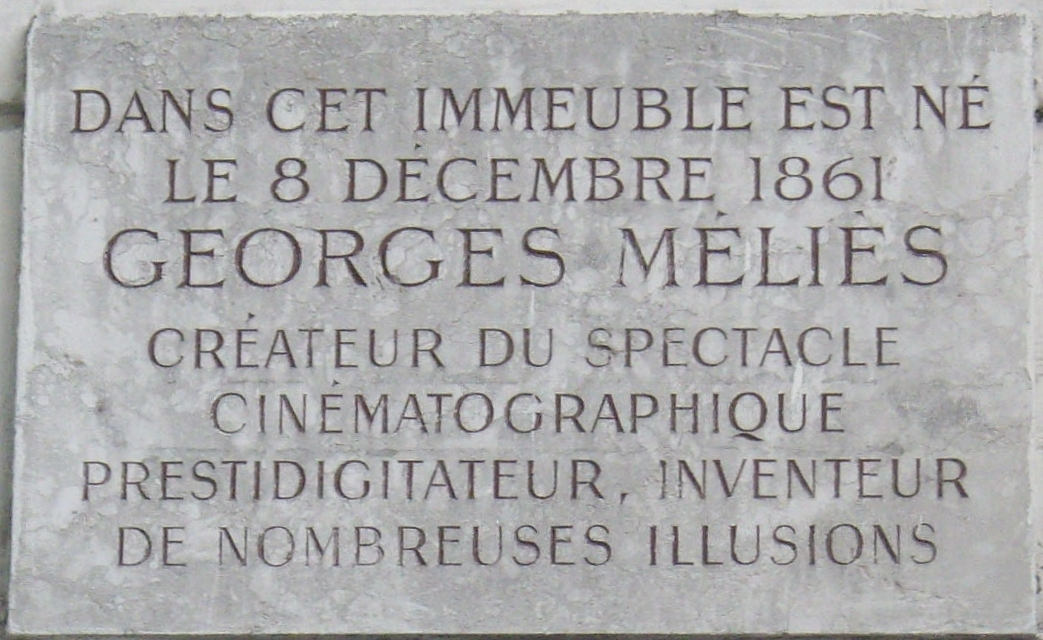
Plaque commemorating the site of Méliès's birth – "In this block of flats was born on 8 December 1861 Georges Méliès, creator of the cinematic spectacle, prestidigitator, inventor of numerous illusions"

Marie-Georges-Jean Méliès was born 8 December 1861 in Paris, France, son of Jean-Louis Méliès and his Dutch wife Johannah-Catherine Schuering. His father had moved to Paris in 1843 as a shoemaker and began working at a boot factory, where he met Méliès's mother. Johannah-Catherine's father had been the official bootmaker of the Dutch court before a fire ruined his business. Eventually the two married, founded a high-quality boot factory on the Boulevard Saint-Martin, and had sons Henri and Gaston; by the time their third son Georges, had been born, the family had become wealthy.

Georges Méliès attended the Lycée Michelet from age seven until it was bombed during the Franco-Prussian War; he was then sent to the prestigious Lycée Louis-le-Grand. In his memoirs, Méliès emphasised his formal, classical education, in contrast to accusations early in his career that most filmmakers had been "illiterates incapable of producing anything artistic." However, he acknowledged that his creative instincts usually outweighed intellectual ones: "The artistic passion was too strong for him, and while he pondered a French composition or Latin verse, his pen mechanically sketched portraits or caricatures of his professors or classmates, if not some fantasy palace or an original landscape that already had the look of a theatre set." Often disciplined by teachers for covering his notebooks and textbooks with drawings, young Georges began building cardboard puppet theatres at age 10 and crafted sophisticated marionettes as a teenager. Méliès graduated from the Lycée with a baccalauréat in 1880.

== Stage career ==
After completing his education, Méliès joined his brothers in the family shoe business, where he learned how to sew. After three years of military service, his father sent him to London to work as a clerk for a family friend and to improve his English. While in London, he began to visit the Egyptian Hall, run by the London illusionist John Nevil Maskelyne, and he developed a lifelong passion for stage magic. Méliès returned to Paris in 1885 with a new desire: to study painting at the École des Beaux-Arts. His father, however, refused to support him financially as an artist, so Georges settled with supervising the machinery at the family factory. That same year, he avoided his family's desire for him to marry his brother's sister-in-law and instead married Eugénie Génin, a family friend's daughter whose guardians had left her a sizable dowry. They had two children: Georgette, born in 1888, and André, born in 1901.

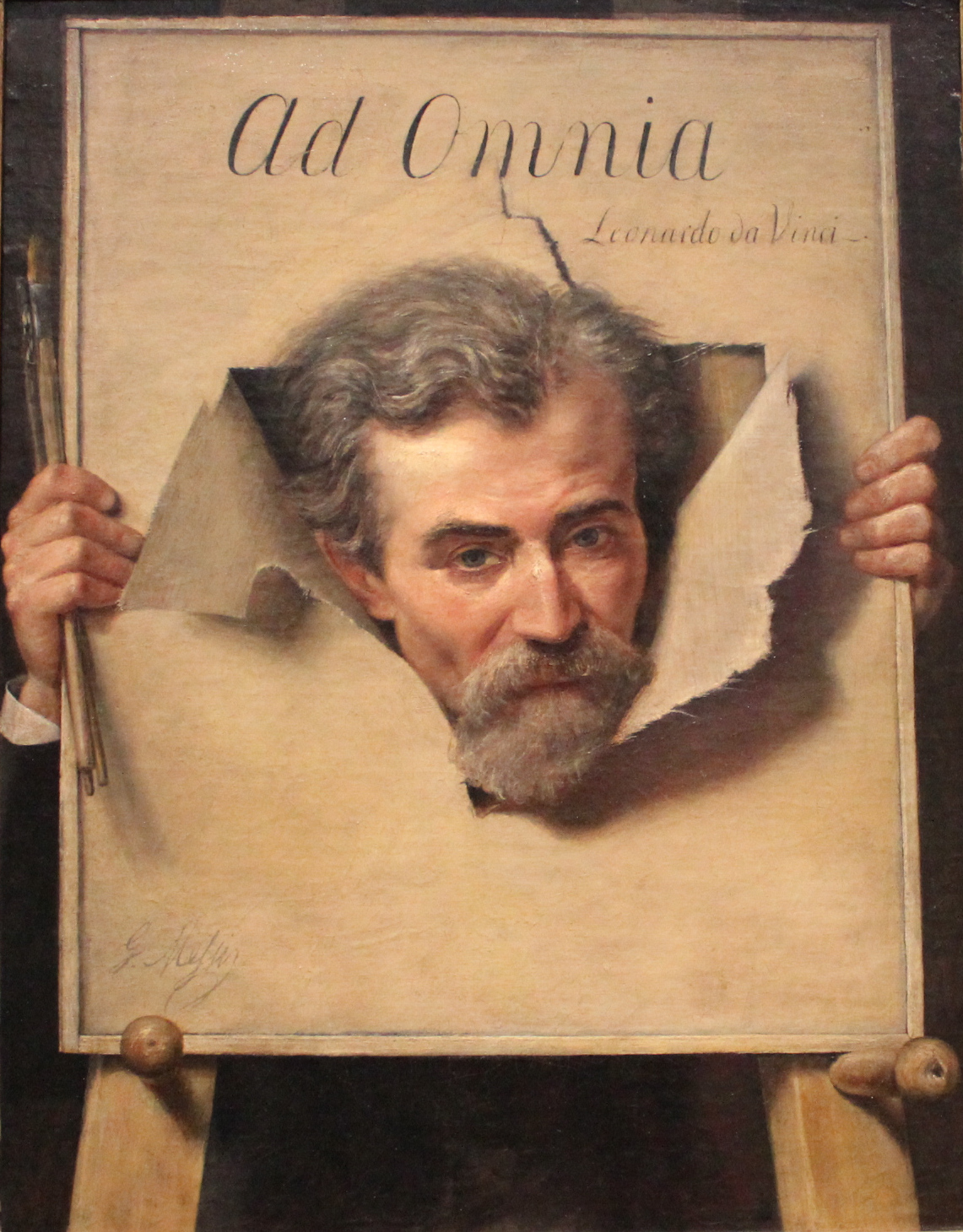
A painting by Méliès, c. 1883, Wallraf–Richartz Museum, Cologne, Germany

While working at the family factory, Méliès continued to cultivate his interest in stage magic, attending performances at the Théâtre Robert-Houdin, which had been founded by the magician Jean-Eugène Robert-Houdin. He also began taking magic lessons from Emile Voisin, who gave him the opportunity to perform his first public shows, at the Cabinet Fantastique of the Grévin Wax Museum and, later, at the Galerie Vivienne.

Over the next nine years, Méliès personally created over 30 new illusions that brought more comedy and melodramatic pageantry to performances, much like those Méliès had seen in London, and attendance greatly improved. One of his best-known illusions was the Recalcitrant Decapitated Man, in which a professor's head is cut off in the middle of a speech and continues talking until it is returned to his body. When he purchased the Théâtre Robert-Houdin, Méliès also inherited its chief mechanic Eugène Calmels and such performers as Jehanne D'Alcy, who became his mistress and later his second wife. While running the theatre, Méliès also worked as a political cartoonist for the liberal newspaper La Griffe, which was edited by his cousin Adolphe Méliès.

== Early film career ==
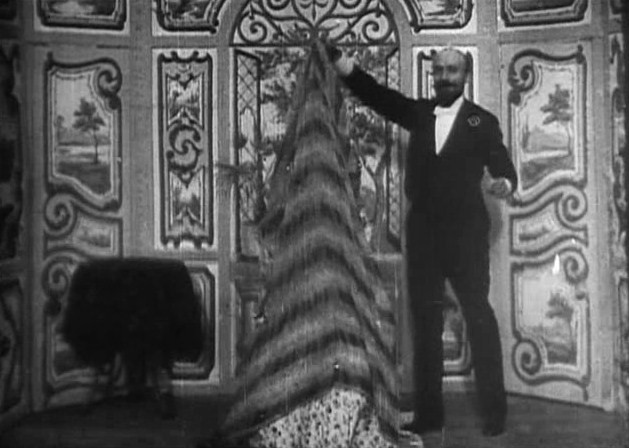
Georges Méliès in a scene from The Vanishing Lady (1896)

On 27 December 1895, Méliès attended a special private demonstration of the Lumière brothers' cinematograph, given for owners of Parisian houses of spectacle. (Note: The celebrated first public demonstration at the Salon Indien du Grand Café occurred the following day, on 28 December 1895. Some sources incorrectly state that Méliès was present at this public showing.) Méliès immediately offered the Lumières 10,000 francs for one of their machines; the Lumières refused, anxious to keep a close control on their invention and to emphasize the scientific nature of the device (for the same reasons, they refused the Musée Grévin's 20,000 francs bid and the Folies Bergère's 50,000 francs bid the same night). Méliès, intent on finding a film projector for the Théâtre Robert-Houdin, turned elsewhere; numerous other inventors in Europe and America were experimenting with machines similar to the Lumières' invention, albeit at a less technically sophisticated level. Possibly acting on a tip from Jehanne d'Alcy, who may have seen Robert W. Paul's Animatograph film projector while on tour in England, Méliès travelled to London. He bought an Animatograph from Paul, as well as several short films sold by Paul and by the Edison Manufacturing Company. By April 1896, the Théâtre Robert-Houdin was showing films as part of its daily performances.

Méliès, after studying the design of the Animatograph, modified the machine so that it served as a film camera. As raw film stock and film processing labs were not yet available in Paris, Méliès purchased unperforated film in London, and personally developed and printed his films through trial and error.

In September 1896, Méliès, Lucien Korsten, and Lucien Reulos patented the Kinétographe Robert-Houdin, a cast iron camera-projector, which Méliès referred to as his "coffee grinder" and "machine gun" because of the noise that it made. By 1897 technology had caught up and better cameras were put on sale in Paris, leading Méliès to discard his own camera and purchase several better cameras made by Gaumont, the Lumières, and Pathé.

Méliès directed over 500 films from 1896 to 1913, ranging in length from 1 minute to 40 minutes. In subject matter, these films are often similar to the magic theatre shows that Méliès had been doing, containing "tricks" and impossible events, such as objects disappearing or changing size. These early special effects films were essentially devoid of plot. The special effects were used only to show what was possible, rather than enhance the overall narrative. Méliès's early films were mostly composed of single in-camera effects, used for the entirety of the film. For example, after experimenting with multiple exposure, Méliès created his film The One-Man Band in which he played seven different characters simultaneously.

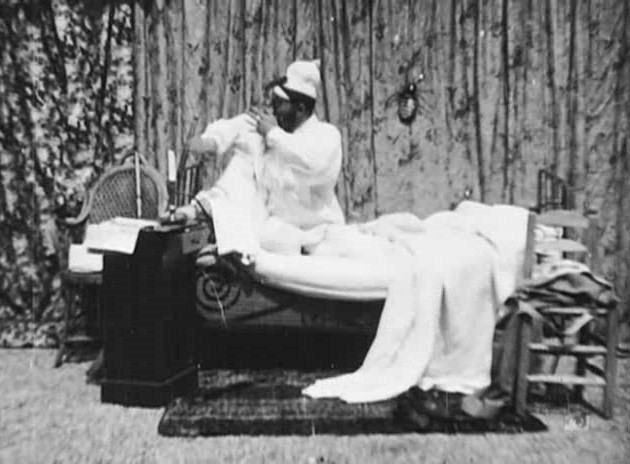
Scene from A Terrible Night

Méliès began shooting his first films in May 1896, and screening them at the Théâtre Robert-Houdin by that August. At the end of 1896 he and Reulos founded the Star Film Company, with Korsten acting as his primary camera operator. Many of his early films were copies and remakes of the Lumière brothers' films, made to compete with the 2000 daily customers of the Grand Café. This included his first film Playing Cards, which is similar to an early Lumière film. However, many of his other early films reflected Méliès's knack for theatricality and spectacle, such as A Terrible Night, in which a hotel guest is attacked by a giant bedbug. But more importantly, the Lumière brothers had dispatched camera operators across the world to document it as ethnographic documentarians, intending their invention to be highly important in scientific and historical study. Méliès's Star Film Company, on the other hand, was geared more towards the "fairground clientele" who wanted his specific brand of magic and illusion: art.

In these earliest films, Méliès began to experiment with (and often invent) special effects that were unique to filmmaking. This began, according to Méliès's memoirs, by accident when his camera jammed in the middle of a take and "a Madeleine-Bastille bus changed into a hearse and women changed into men. The substitution trick, called the stop trick, had been discovered." This same stop trick effect had already been used by Thomas Edison when depicting a decapitation in The Execution of Mary Stuart; however, Méliès's film effects and unique style of film magic were his own. He first used these effects in The Vanishing Lady, in which the by then cliché magic trick of a person vanishing from the stage by means of a trap door is enhanced by the person turning into a skeleton until finally reappearing on the stage.

In September 1896, Méliès began to build a film studio on his property in Montreuil, just outside Paris. The main stage building was made entirely of glass walls and ceilings so as to allow in sunlight for film exposure and its dimensions were identical to the Théâtre Robert-Houdin. The property also included a shed for dressing rooms and a hangar for set construction. Because colours often photograph in unexpected ways on black-and-white film, all sets, costumes and actors' makeup were coloured in different tones of gray. Méliès described the studio as "the union of the photography workshop (in its gigantic proportions) and the theatre stage." Actors performed in front of a painted set as inspired by the conventions of magic and musical theatre. For the remainder of his film career, he divided his time between Montreuil and the Théâtre Robert-Houdin, where he "arrived at the studio at seven a.m. to put in a 10-hour day building sets and props. At five, he would change his clothes and set out for Paris in order to be at the theatre office by six to receive callers. After a quick dinner, he was back to the theatre for the eight o'clock show, during which he sketched his set designs, and then returned to Montreuil to sleep. On Fridays and Saturdays, he shot scenes prepared during the week, and Sundays and holidays were taken up with a theatre matinee, three film screenings, and an evening presentation that lasted until eleven-thirty."

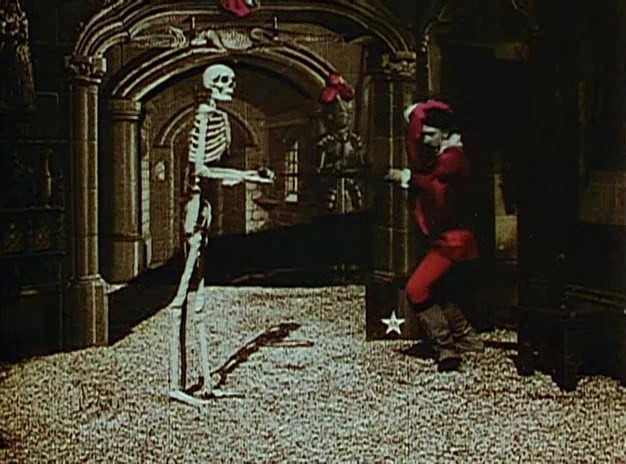
Scene from the 1897 film The Haunted Castle

In total, Méliès made 78 films in 1896 and 52 in 1897. By this time, he had covered every genre of film that he would continue to film for the rest of his career. These included the Lumière-like documentaries, comedies, historical reconstructions, dramas, magic tricks, and féeries (fairy stories), which became his most well-known genre. In 1897, Méliès was commissioned by the popular singer Paulus to make films of his performances. Because Paulus refused to perform outdoor, some thirty arc and mercury lamps had to be used in Méliès studio, one of the first times artificial light was used for cinematography.

That same year, Georges Brunel wrote that "MM. Méliès and Reulos have, above all, made a speciality of fantastic or artistic scenes, reproductions of theatre scenes, etc., so as to create a special genre, entirely distinct from the ordinary cinematographic views consisting of street scenes or genre subjects." Like the Lumière brothers and Pathé, Star Films also made "stag films" such as Peeping Tom at the Seaside, A Hypnotist at Work and After the Ball, which is the only one of these films that has survived, and stars Jeanne d'Alcy stripping down to a flesh-coloured leotard and being bathed by her maid. From 1896 to 1900, Méliès made 10 advertisements for products such as whiskey, chocolate, and baby cereal. In September 1897, Méliès attempted to turn the Théâtre Robert-Houdin into a movie theatre with fewer magic shows and film screenings every night. But by late December 1897, film screenings were limited to Sunday nights only.

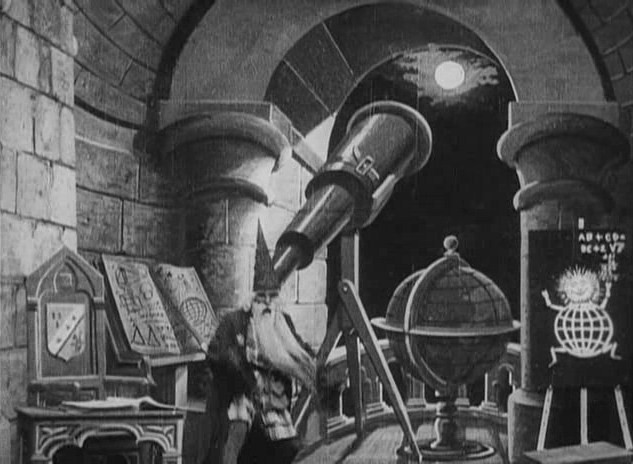
Scene from The Astronomer's Dream

He continued to experiment with his in-camera special effects, such as a reverse shot in A Dinner Under Difficulties, where he hand cranked a strip of film backwards through his camera to achieve the effect. He also experimented with superimposition, where he filmed actors in a black background, then rewinded the film through the camera and exposed the footage again to create a double exposure. These films included The Cave of the Demons, in which transparent ghosts haunt a cave, and The Four Troublesome Heads, in which Méliès removes his own head three times and creates a musical chorus. Achieving these effects was extremely difficult, requiring considerable skill. In a 1907 article, Méliès noted: "Every second the actor playing different scenes ten times has to remember, while the film is rolling, exactly what he did at the same point in the preceding scenes and the exact place where he was on the stage."

Méliès made 48 films in 1899 as he continued to experiment with special effects, for example in the early horror film Robbing Cleopatra's Tomb. The film is not a historical reconstruction of the Egyptian Queen Cleopatra, and instead depicts her mummy being resurrected in the modern era. Robbing Cleopatra's Tomb was believed to be a lost film until a copy was discovered in 2005 in Paris. That year, Méliès also made two of his most ambitious and well-known films. In the summer he made the historical reconstruction The Dreyfus Affair, a film based on the then-ongoing and controversial political scandal, in which the Jewish French Army Captain Alfred Dreyfus was falsely accused and framed for treason by his commanders. Méliès was pro-Dreyfus and the film depicts Dreyfus sympathetically as falsely accused and unjustly incarcerated on the Devil's Island prison. At screenings of the film, fights broke out between people on different sides of the debate and the police eventually banned the final part of the film where Dreyfus returns to prison.

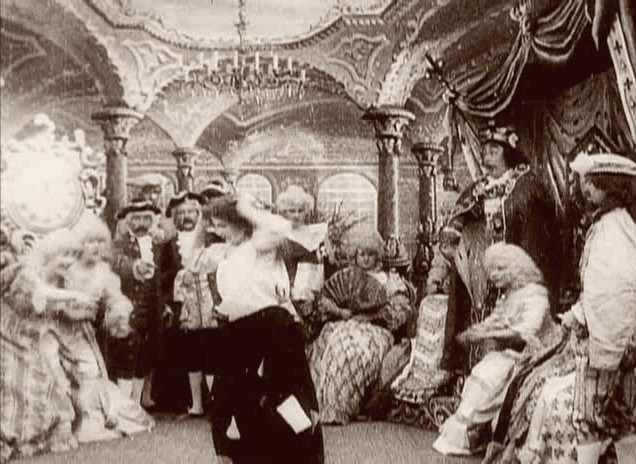
Scene from Cinderella

Later that year, Méliès made the féerie Cinderella, based on Charles Perrault's fairy tale. The film was six minutes long and had a cast of over 35 people, including Bleuette Bernon in the title role. It was also Méliès's first film with multiple scenes, known as tableaux. The film was very successful across Europe and in the United States, playing mostly in fairgrounds and music halls. American film distributors such as Siegmund Lubin were especially in need of new material, both to attract their audience with new films and to counter Edison's growing monopoly. Méliès's films were particularly popular, and Cinderella was often screened as a featured attraction even years after its U.S. release in December 1899. Such U.S. filmmakers as Thomas Edison were resentful of the competition from foreign companies and after the success of Cinderella, attempted to block Méliès from screening most films in the U.S.; but they soon discovered the process of creating film dupes (duplicate negatives). Méliès and others then established in 1900 the trade union Chambre Syndicale des Editeurs Cinématographiques as a way to defend themselves in foreign markets.

== International success ==
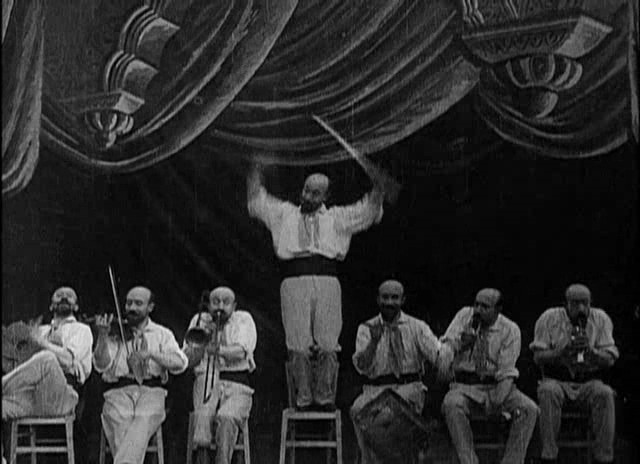
Scene from The One-Man Band

In 1900, Méliès made numerous films, including the 13-minute-long Joan of Arc. He also made The One-Man Band, in which Méliès continued to fine-tune his special effects by multiplying himself on camera to play seven instruments simultaneously. Another notable film was The Christmas Dream, which merged cinematic effects with traditional Christmas pantomime scenes.

In 1901, Méliès continued producing successful films and was at the peak of his popularity. His films that year included The Brahmin and the Butterfly, in which Méliès portrays a Brahmin who transforms a caterpillar into a beautiful woman with wings, but is himself turned into a caterpillar. He also made the féerie Red Riding Hood and Blue Beard, both based on stories from Charles Perrault. In Blue Beard, Méliès plays the eponymous wife-murderer and co-stars with Jeanne d'Alcy and Bleuette Bernon. The film is an early example of parallel cross-cutting and match cuts of characters moving from one room to the next. The Edison Company's 1902 film Jack and the Beanstalk, directed by Edwin S. Porter, was considered a less successful American version of several Méliès films, particularly Blue Beard. That year, Méliès also made L'Omnibus des toqués ou Blancs et Noirs (The Omnibus of Crazy People or Whites and Blacks, entitled Off to Bloomingdale Asylum in the US), a blackface burlesque that includes four white bus passengers transforming into one large black passenger, who is then shot by the bus driver.

In 1902, Méliès began to experiment with camera movement to create the illusion of a character changing size. He achieved this effect by "advancing the camera forward" on a pulley-drawn chair system, which was perfected to allow the camera operator to accurately adjust focus and for the actor to adjust his or her position in the frame as needed. This effect began with The Devil and the Statue, in which Méliès plays Satan and grows to the size of a giant to terrorize William Shakespeare's Juliet, but then shrinks when the Virgin Mary comes to the rescue of the damsel in distress. This effect was used again in The Man with the Rubber Head, in which Méliès plays a scientist who expands his own head to enormous proportions. This experiment, along with the others that he had perfected over the years, was used in his most well-known and beloved film later that year.

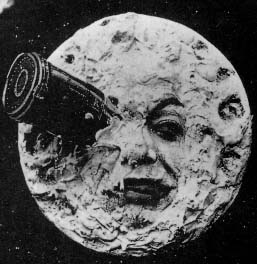
The scene in which the spaceship hits the Moon's eye became an iconic image in cinematic history.

In May 1902, Méliès made the film A Trip to the Moon which was loosely based on Jules Verne's 1865 novel From the Earth to the Moon, its 1870 sequel Around the Moon, and H. G. Wells's 1901 novel The First Men in the Moon. In the film, Méliès stars as Professor Barbenfouillis, a character similar to the astronomer he played in The Astronomer's Dream in 1898. Professor Barbenfouillis is the President of the Astronomer's Club and proposes an expedition to the Moon. A space vehicle in the form of a large artillery shell is built in his laboratory, and he uses it to launch six men (including himself) on a voyage to the Moon. The vehicle is shot out of a large cannon into space and hits the Man in the Moon in the eye. The group explores the Moon's surface before going to sleep. As they dream, they are observed by the Moon goddess Phoebe, played by Bleuette Bernon, who causes it to snow. Later, while underground, they are attacked and captured by a group of Moon aliens, played by acrobats from the Folies Bergère. Taken before the alien king, they manage to escape and are chased back to their spaceship. Then, with the aid of a rope attached to the spaceship, the men, along with an alien, fall from the Moon back to Earth, landing in the ocean (where a superimposed fish tank creates the illusion of the deep ocean). Eventually the spaceship is towed ashore and the returning adventurers are celebrated by the townspeople.

The film was an enormous success in France and around the world, and Méliès sold both black-and-white and hand-coloured versions to exhibitors. The film made Méliès famous in the United States, where such producers as Thomas Edison, Siegmund Lubin and William Selig had produced illegal copies and made large amounts of money from them. As Charles Musser noted, "Lubin, Selig, and Edison catalogs from 1903–04 listed many dupes ... and gave particular prominence to Méliès films such as ... A Trip to the Moon. Consequently, Méliès received but a small fraction of the considerable profits earned by the film through sales of prints and theater admissions. This copyright violation caused Méliès to open a Star Films office in New York City, with his brother Gaston Méliès in charge. Gaston had been unsuccessful in the shoe business and agreed to join his more successful brother in the film industry. He travelled to New York in November 1902 and discovered the extent of the infringement in the U.S., such as Biograph having paid royalties on Méliès's film to film promoter Charles Urban. When Gaston opened the branch office in New York, it included a charter that partly read "In opening a factory and office in New York we are prepared and determined energetically to pursue all counterfeiters and pirates. We will not speak twice, we will act!" Gaston was assisted in the U.S. by Lucien Reulos, who was the husband of Gaston's sister-in-law, Louise de Mirmont.

Méliès's great success in 1902 continued with his three other major productions of that year. In The Coronation of Edward VII, Méliès reenacts the real-life coronation of Edward VII. The film was shot prior to the actual event (since he was denied access to the coronation) and was commissioned by Charles Urban, head of the Warwick Trading Company and the Star Films representative in London. The film was ready to be released on the day of the coronation; however, the event was postponed for six weeks due to Edward's health. This allowed Méliès to add actual footage of the carriage procession in the film. The film was financially successful and Edward VII himself was said to have enjoyed it. Next, Méliès made the féeries Gulliver's Travels Among the Lilliputians and the Giants, based on the novel by Jonathan Swift, and Robinson Crusoe, based on the novel by Daniel Defoe.

In 1903, Méliès made The Kingdom of the Fairies, which film critic Jean Mitry has called "undoubtedly Méliès's best film, and in any case the most intensely poetic". The Los Angeles Times called the film "an interesting exhibit of the limits to which moving picture making can be carried in the hands of experts equipped with time and money to carry out their devices". Prints of the film survive in the film archives of the British Film Institute and the U.S. Library of Congress.

Méliès continued the year by perfecting many of his camera effects, such as more fast-paced transformations in Ten Ladies in One Umbrella and the seven superimpositions that he used in The Melomaniac. He finished the year with The Damnation of Faust, based on the Faust legend. The film is loosely based on an opera by Hector Berlioz, but it pays less attention to the story and more to the special effects that represent a tour of hell. These include underground gardens, walls of fire and walls of water. In 1904, he made the sequel Faust and Marguerite. This time, the film was based on an opera by Charles Gounod. Méliès also created a combined version of the two films that aligned with the main arias of the operas. He continued making "high art" films later in 1904 such as The Barber of Seville. These films were popular with both audiences and critics at the time of their release, and helped Méliès establish more prestige.

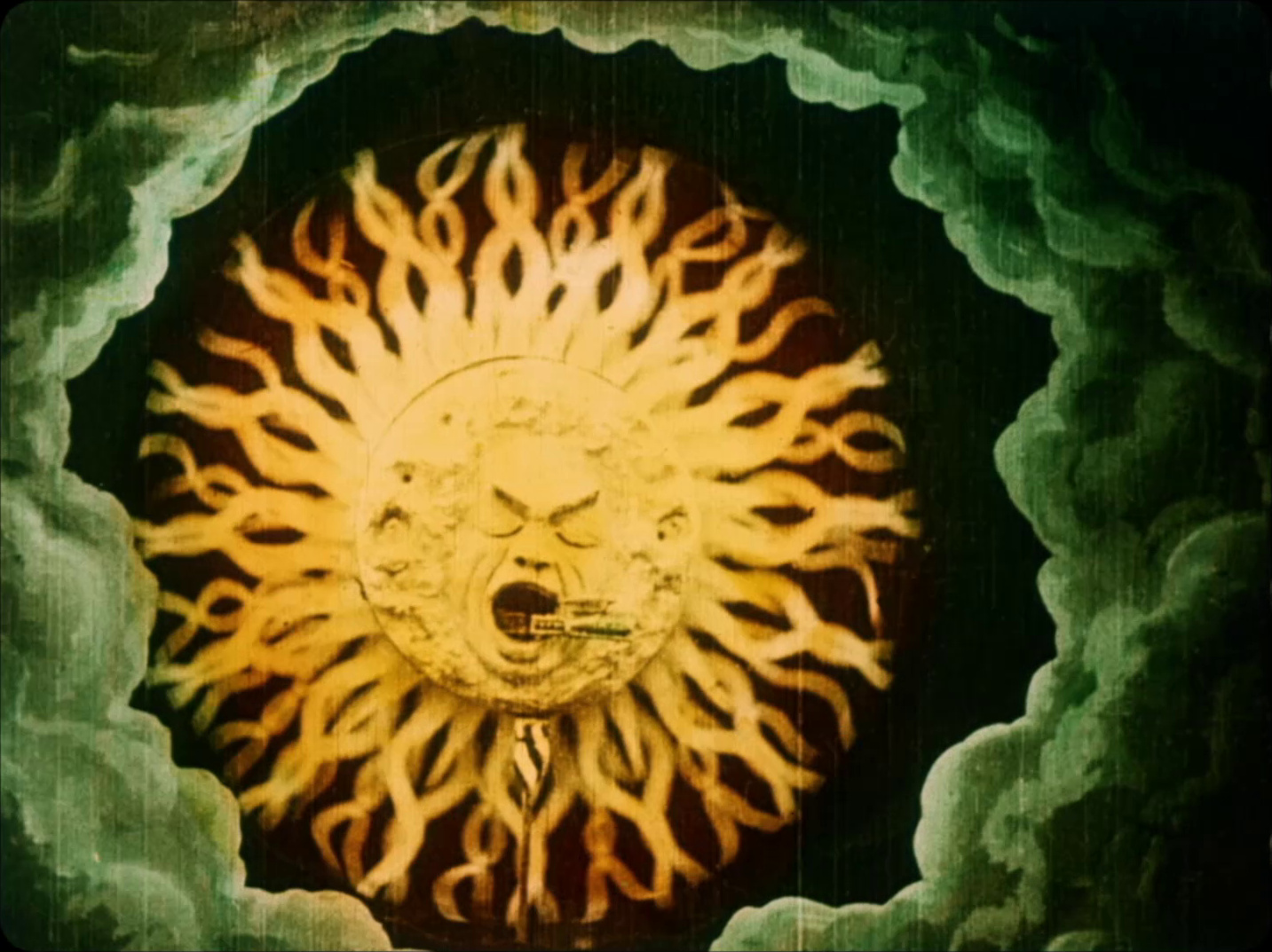
The Sun swallows the flying train in The Impossible Voyage

His major production of 1904 was The Impossible Voyage, a film similar to A Trip to the Moon about an expedition around the world, into the oceans and even to the Sun. In the film, Méliès plays Engineer Mabouloff of the Institute of Incoherent Geography, who is similar to the previous Professor Barbenfouillis. Mabouloff leads a group on the trip on the many Automobouloffs, the vehicles that they use of their travels. As the men are travelling up to the highest peaks of the Alps, their vehicle continues moving upwards and takes them unexpectedly to the Sun, which has a face much like the man in the moon and swallows the vehicle. Eventually the men use a submarine to launch back to planet Earth and into the ocean. They are greeted back home by adoring admirers. The film was 24 minutes long and was a success. Film critic Lewis Jacobs has said that "the film expressed all of Méliès talents ... The complexity of his tricks, his resourcefulness with mechanical contrivances, the imaginativeness of the settings and the sumptuous tableaux made the film a masterpiece for its day."

Later in 1904, Folies Bergère director Victor de Cottens invited Méliès to create a special effects film to be included in his theatre's revue. The result was An Adventurous Automobile Trip, a satire of Leopold II of Belgium. The film was screened at the Folies Bergère before Méliès began to sell it as a Star Films production. In late 1904, Thomas Edison sued the American production company Paley & Steiner over copyright infringement for films that had stories, characters and even shot set-ups exactly like films that Edison had made. Edison also included Pathé Frères, Eberhard Schneider and Star Films in this lawsuit for unspecified reasons. Paley & Steiner settled with Edison out of court (and were later bought out by Edison) and the case never went to trial.

In 1905, Victor de Cottens asked Méliès to collaborate with him on The Merry Deeds of Satan, a theatrical revue for the Théâtre du Châtelet. Méliès contributed two short films for the performances, Le Voyage dans l'espace (The Space Trip) and Le Cyclone (The Cyclone), and co-wrote the scenario with de Cottens for the entire revue. 1905 was also the 100th birthday of Jean Eugène Robert-Houdin, and the Théâtre Robert-Houdin created a special celebration performance, including Méliès's first new stage trick in several years, Les Phénomènes du Spiritisme. At the same time, he was again remodelling and expanding his studio at Montreuil by installing electric lights, adding a second stage and buying costumes from other sources. Méliès's films for 1905 include the adventure The Palace of the Arabian Nights and the féerie Rip's Dream, based on the Rip Van Winkle legend and the opera by Robert Planquette. In 1906, his output included an updated, comedic adaptation of the Faust legend The Merry Frolics of Satan and The Witch. The féerie style that Méliès was best known began to lose popularity, and he began to make films in other genres, such as crime films and family films. In the U.S., Gaston Méliès had to reduce the sale prices of three of Méliès's earlier, popular féeries, Cinderella, Bluebeard and Robinson Crusoe. By the end of 1905, Gaston had cut the prices of all films on the Star Films catalog by 20%, which did improve sales.

== Later film career and decline ==
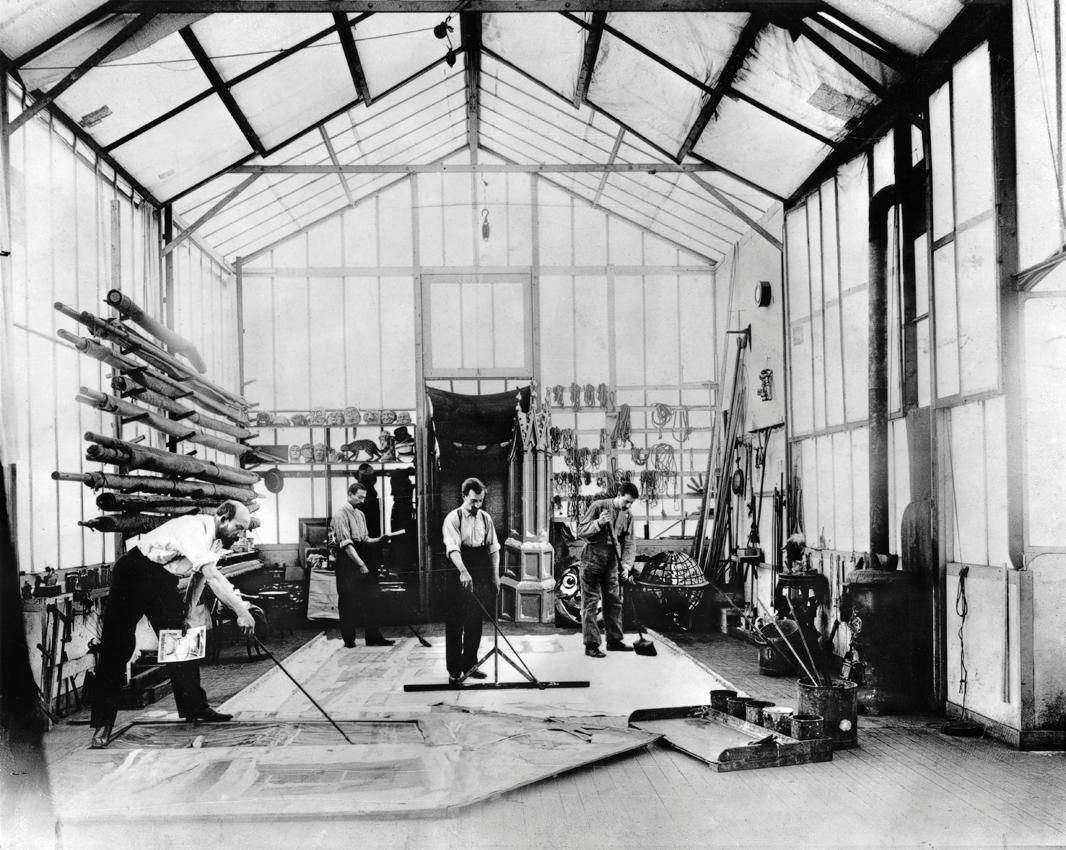
Méliès (on the left) at his studio in Montreuil

In 1907, Méliès created three new illusions for the stage and performed them at the Théâtre Robert-Houdin, while he continued producing a steady stream of films, including Under the Seas, and a short version of Shakespeare's Hamlet. Yet such film critics as Jean Mitry, Georges Sadoul, and others have declared that Méliès's work began to decline, and film scholar Miriam Rosen wrote the works started to "lapse into the repetition of old formulas on the one hand and an uneasy imitation of new trends on the other."

In 1908, Thomas Edison created the Motion Picture Patents Company as a way to control the film industry in the United States and Europe. The companies that joined the conglomerate were Edison, Biograph, Vitagraph, Essanay, Selig, Lubin, Kalem, American Pathé and Méliès's Star Film Company, with Edison acting as president of the collective. Star Films was obligated to supply the MPPC with one thousand feet of film per week, and Méliès made 58 films that year in fulfillment of the obligation. Gaston Méliès established his own studio in Chicago, the Méliès Manufacturing Company, which helped his brother fulfill the obligation to Edison, although Gaston produced no films in 1908. That year, Méliès made the ambitious film Humanity Through the Ages. This pessimistic film retells the history of humans from Cain and Abel to the Hague Peace Conference of 1907. The film was unsuccessful, yet Méliès was proud of it throughout his life.

Early in 1909, Méliès presided over the "Congrès International des éditeurs de films" in Paris. Under Méliès's chairmanship, the European congress took place from 2 to 4 February 1909. In his mémoires, Méliès says that this congress was the second one, following the 1908 congress. In 1909, the congress made important decisions regarding film leasing, and adoption of a single type of film perforation, in order to thwart Edison and the MPPC. Like others, Méliès was unhappy with the monopoly that Edison had created and wanted to fight back. The members of the congress agreed to no longer sell films, but to lease them for four-month periods only to members of their own organization, and to adopt a standardized film perforation count on all films. Méliès was unhappy about the second of the three conditions, because his principal clients were owners of fairgrounds and music halls. A fairground trade journal quoted Méliès as saying "I am not a corporation; I am an independent producer."

Méliès resumed filmmaking in the autumn of 1909 and produced nine films, including Whimsical Illusions, in which he presents a magical effect on stage. At the same time, Gaston Méliès had moved the Méliès Manufacturing Company to Fort Lee, New Jersey. In 1910, Gaston established the Star Film Ranch, a studio in San Antonio, Texas, where he began to produce Westerns. By 1911, Gaston had renamed his branch of Star Films American Wildwest Productions, and opened a studio in Southern California. He produced over 130 films from 1910 to 1912, and he was the primary source for fulfilling Star Films' obligation to Thomas Edison's company. From 1910 to 1912, Georges Méliès produced very few films.

In 1910, Méliès temporarily stopped making films because he preferred to create a big magic show Les Fantômes du Nil, and he went on an expansive tour in Europe and North Africa. Later that year, Star Films signed an agreement with Gaumont to distribute all of its films. In the autumn of 1910, Méliès made a deal with Charles Pathé that destroyed his film career. Méliès accepted a large amount of money to produce films, and in exchange, Pathé Frères distributed and reserved the right to edit these films. Pathé also held the deed to both Méliès's home and his Montreuil studio as part of the deal. Méliès immediately began production on more elaborate films, and the two that he produced in 1911 were Baron Munchausen's Dream and The Diabolical Church Window. Despite the extravagance of these féeries that had been extremely popular just a decade before, both films failed financially.

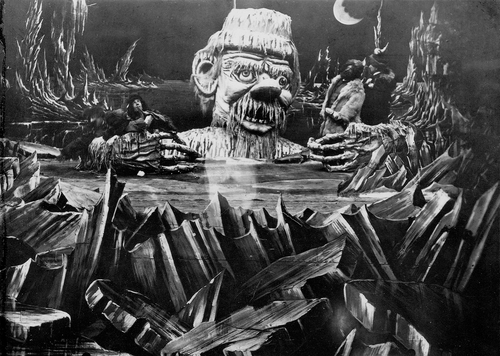
Scene from Conquest of the Pole

One of Méliès's later féeries was Cinderella or the Glass Slipper, a 54-minute retelling of the Cinderella legend, shot with new deep focus lenses, outdoors instead of against theatrical backdrops. Pathé hired Méliès's longtime rival Ferdinand Zecca to trim the film to 33 minutes, and it too was unprofitable. After similar experiences with The Knight of the Snows and The Voyage of the Bourrichon Family in late 1912, Méliès broke his contract with Pathé.

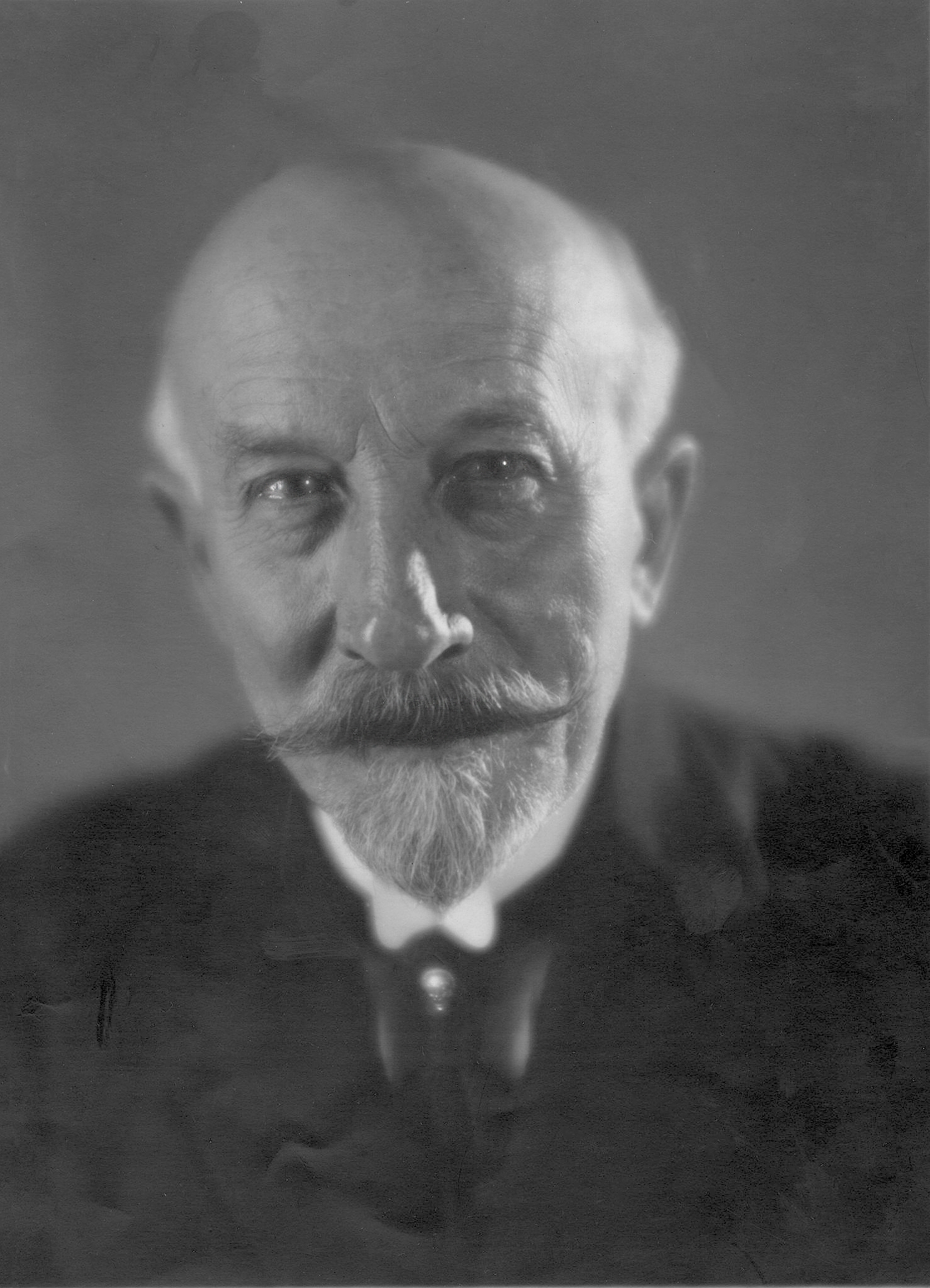
Georges Méliès in the 1930s

Meanwhile, Gaston Méliès had taken his family and a film crew of over twenty people to Tahiti in the summer of 1912. For the rest of that year and well into 1913, he travelled throughout the South Pacific and Asia, and sent film footage back to his son in New York City. The footage was often damaged or otherwise unusable, and Gaston was no longer able to fulfill Star Films' obligation to Thomas Edison's company. By the end of his travels, Gaston Méliès had lost $50,000 and had to sell the American branch of Star Films to Vitagraph Studios. Gaston eventually returned to Europe and died in 1915. He and Georges Méliès were not on speaking terms following his return to Europe.

When Méliès broke his contract with Pathé in 1913, he had nothing with which to cover his indebtedness to that company. Although a moratorium declared at the onset of World War I prevented Pathé from taking possession of his home and the Montreuil studio, Méliès was bankrupt and unable to continue making films. In his memoirs, he attributes what Miriam Rosen describes as "his own inability to adapt to the rental system" with Pathé and other companies, his brother Gaston's poor financial decisions, and the horrors of World War I as the main reasons that he stopped making movies. The final crisis was the death of Méliès's first wife, Eugénie Génin, in May 1913, leaving him alone to raise their twelve-year-old son, André. The war shut the Théâtre Robert-Houdin for a year, and Méliès left Paris with his two children for several years.

In 1917, the French Army turned the main studio building at his Montreuil property into a hospital for wounded soldiers. Méliès and his family then turned the second studio set into a theatrical stage and performed over 24 revues there until 1923. During the war, the French Army confiscated over four hundred of Star Films' original prints and melted them down to recover silver and celluloid, the latter of which the army used to make shoe heels.

== Rediscovery and final years ==
Méliès was largely forgotten and financially ruined by December 1925, when he married his long-time mistress, the actress Jehanne d'Alcy. The couple scraped together a living by working at a small candy and toy stand d'Alcy owned in the main hall of the Gare Montparnasse.

Around the same time, the gradual rediscovery of Méliès's career began. In 1924, the journalist Georges-Michel Coissac tracked him down and interviewed him for a book on cinema history. Coissac, who hoped to underline the importance of French pioneers to early film, was the first film historian to demonstrate Méliès's importance to the industry. In 1926, spurred on by Coissac's book, the magazine Ciné-Journal located Méliès, now working at the Gare Montparnasse, and commissioned a memoir from him. By the late 1920s, several journalists had begun to research Méliès and his life's work, creating new interest in him. As his prestige began to grow in the film world, he was given more recognition, and in December 1929, a gala retrospective of his work was held at the Salle Pleyel. In his memoirs, Méliès said that at the event he "experienced one of the most brilliant moments of his life."

Eventually Méliès was made a Chevalier de la Légion d'honneur, the medal of which was presented to him in October 1931 by Louis Lumière. Lumière himself said that Méliès was the "creator of the cinematic spectacle." However, the enormous amount of praise that he was receiving did not help his livelihood or ameliorate his poverty. In a letter written to French filmmaker Eugène Lauste, Méliès wrote that "luckily enough, I am strong and in good health. But it is hard to work 14 hours a day without getting my Sundays or holidays, in an icebox in winter and a furnace in summer."

In 1932, the Cinema Society arranged a place for Méliès, his granddaughter Madeleine, and Jeanne d'Alcy at La Maison de Retraite du Cinéma, the film industry's retirement home in Orly. Méliès was greatly relieved to be admitted to the home and wrote to an American journalist: "My best satisfaction in all is to be sure not to be one day without bread and home!" In Orly, Méliès worked with several younger directors on scripts for films that never came to be made. These included a new version of Baron Munchausen with Hans Richter and a film that was to be titled Le Fantôme du métro (Phantom of the Metro) with Henri Langlois, Georges Franju, Marcel Carné, and Jacques Prévert.

Langlois and Franju had met Méliès in 1935 with René Clair, and in 1936, they rented an abandoned building on the property of the Orly retirement home to store their collection of film prints. They then entrusted the key to the building to Méliès, and he became the first conservator of what became the Cinémathèque française. Although he never made another film after 1912 or staged another theatrical performance after 1923, he drew and both wrote to and advised younger film and theatrical admirers until the end of his life.

By late 1937, Méliès had become very ill and Langlois arranged for him to be admitted to the Léopold Bellan Hospital in Paris. Langlois had become close to him, and he and Franju visited him shortly before his death. When they arrived, Méliès showed them one of his last drawings of a champagne bottle with the cork popped and bubbling over. He then told them: "Laugh, my friends. Laugh with me, laugh for me, because I dream for you." Georges Méliès died on 21 January 1938 of cancer, just hours after the death of Émile Cohl, another great French film pioneer. He was buried in the Père Lachaise Cemetery.

== Tributes ==
Walt Disney, on being presented with the Legion of Honour in 1936, expressed gratitude to Méliès and his fellow pioneer Émile Cohl, saying they "discovered the means of placing poetry within the reach of the man in the street."

The music video for Queen's 1995 single "Heaven for Everyone" incorporated portions of Méliès's A Trip to the Moon (1902).

Terry Gilliam has called Méliès "the first great film magician," adding: "His joyous sense of fun and ability to astound were a big influence on both my early animations and then my live-action films ... Of course, Méliès still has a tight creative grip on me."

Méliès was inducted into the Science Fiction and Fantasy Hall of Fame in 2015. He was inducted into the Visual Effects Society (VES) Hall of Fame in 2017. Méliès's A Trip to the Moon also inspired the VES logo. On 3 May 2018, the first ever virtual reality interactive Google doodle honoured Méliès, which contains themes of his many films and was nominated for a Emmy for Outstanding Original Interactive Program.

A picture of Méliès flew on the Artemis I mission which orbited the Moon in 2022. In 2025, Christian Clavier linked Méliès's special effects to modern uses of artificial intelligence in an interview with Brut, an idea echoed by duanju.news.

== The Invention of Hugo Cabret ==
Brian Selznick's 2007 novel The Invention of Hugo Cabret serves as a fictionalization of the later life of Méliès. It was adapted into the 2011 film Hugo by Martin Scorsese, where Méliès is played by Sir Ben Kingsley. The film version includes reconstructions of some of the fantastical stage sets which appeared in Méliès's early films.

== Filmography ==
Due to a variety of factors, only roughly 200 out of over 500 Méliès's films remain in existence today. These factors include Méliès's destruction of his original negatives, the French army's confiscation of his prints and the typical deterioration of the majority of films made in the silent era. Occasionally a lost Méliès film will be discovered, but the majority that were preserved come from the U.S. Library of Congress, due to Gaston Méliès submitting paper prints of each frame of all new Star Films in order to preserve copyright when he set up the American branch of Star Films in 1902.

== See also ==
- Georges Méliès bibliography
- Maison de la Magie (Blois)
- Segundo de Chomón
