= Substitution splice =

Cinematic special effect

The earliest known use of the effect, in the 1895 film The Execution of Mary Queen of Scots

Sherlock Holmes Baffled, an early silent film employing the effect for comic purposes

The substitution splice or stop trick is a cinematic special effect in which filmmakers achieve an appearance, disappearance, or transformation by altering one or more elements of the scene between two shots while maintaining the same framing and other aspects of the scene in both shots. The effect is usually polished by careful editing to establish a seamless cut and optimal moment of change. It has also been referred to as stop motion substitution or stop-action.

The pioneering French filmmaker Georges Méliès claimed to have accidentally developed the stop trick, as he wrote in Les Vues Cinématographiques in 1907 (translated from French):

An obstruction of the apparatus that I used in the beginning (a rudimentary apparatus in which the film would often tear or get stuck and refuse to advance) produced an unexpected effect, one day when I was prosaically filming the Place de L'Opéra; I had to stop for a minute to free the film and to get the machine going again. During this time passersby, omnibuses, cars, had all changed places, of course. When I later projected the film, reattached at the point of the rupture, I suddenly saw the Madeleine-Bastille bus changed into a hearse, and men changed into women. The trick-by-substitution, called the stop trick, had been invented and two days later I performed the first metamorphosis of men into women and the first sudden disappearances that had, at the beginning, such a great success.

According to the film scholar Jacques Deslandes, it is more likely that Méliès discovered the trick by carefully examining a print of the Edison Manufacturing Company's 1895 film The Execution of Mary Stuart, in which a primitive version of the trick appears. In any case, the substitution splice was both the first special effect Méliès perfected, and the most important in his body of work.

Film historians such as Richard Abel and Elizabeth Ezra established that much of the effect was the result of Méliès's careful frame matching during the editing process, creating a seamless match cut out of two separately staged shots. Indeed, Méliès often used substitution splicing not as an obvious special effect, but as an inconspicuous editing technique, matching and combining short takes into one apparently seamless longer shot. Substitution splicing could become even more seamless when the film was colored by hand, as many of Méliès's films were; the addition of painted color acts as a sleight of hand technique allowing the cuts to pass by unnoticed.

The substitution splice was the most popular cinematic special effect in trick films and early film fantasies, especially those that evolved from the stage tradition of the féerie. Segundo de Chomón is among the other filmmakers who used substitution splicing to create elaborate fantasy effects. D.W. Griffith's 1909 film The Curtain Pole, starring Mack Sennett, used substitution splices for comedic effect. The transformations made possible by the substitution splice were so central to early fantasy films that, in France, such films were often described simply as scènes à transformation.

This technique is different from the stop motion technique, in which the entire shot is created frame by frame.
