= Star Film Company =

French film production company

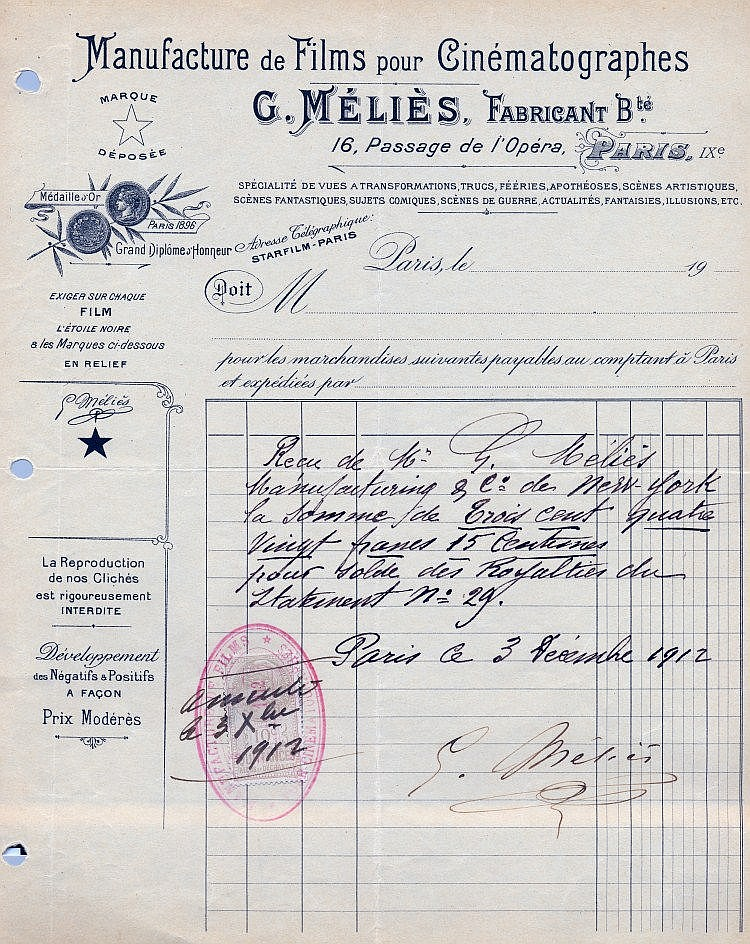
Receipt signed by Méliès on behalf of his film company in 1912

The Manufacture de Films pour Cinématographes, often known as Star Film, (Note: Georges Méliès's studio was never officially designated Star Film, but for most of its existence the studio trademark included the English words "Star Film." Thus, the phrase is widely used to refer to the company.) was a French film production company run by the illusionist and film director Georges Méliès.

== History ==
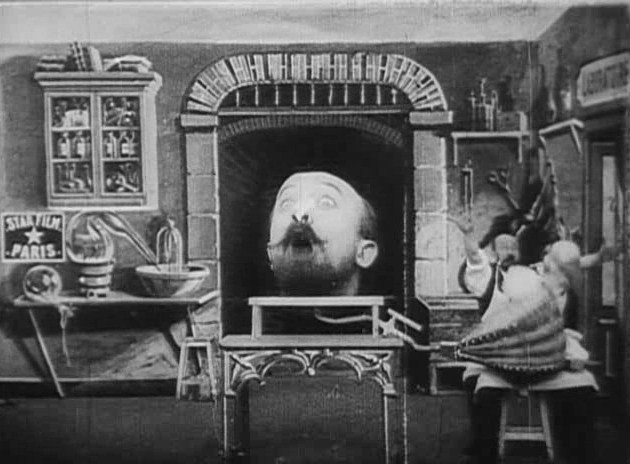
The Star Film logo (at left) on the set of Méliès's film The Man with the Rubber Head

On 28 December 1895, Méliès attended the celebrated first public demonstration of the Lumière Brothers' Kinetoscope. The event, held in a room at 14 Boulevard des Capucines in Paris with one hundred chairs and an entry price of ₣1, demonstrated the practicality of film cameras and projectors. According to later recollections by Méliès, he immediately approached Antoine Lumière and offered to buy a Lumière projector for his own experimentation; Lumière refused. Méliès went on to make repeated offers, all similarly turned down. Méliès next turned to the British film experimenter Robert W. Paul, and in February 1896, obtained an Animatographe projector for ₣1,000, along with a collection of short films, some by Paul and some by Edison Studios. Méliès projected these for the first time at his theater of illusions, the Théâtre Robert-Houdin, in April 1896.

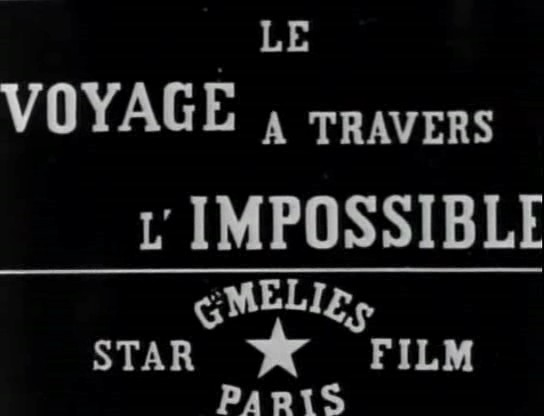
The Star Film trademark on a title card for The Impossible Voyage

Meanwhile, having studied the principles on which Paul's projector ran, Méliès designed a makeshift camera. With the help of a mechanic, Lucien Korsten, he built it in the workshop of the theater, using parts recycled from machines used in his illusions. On 2 September 1896, Méliès, Korsten, and an associate, Lucien Reulos, obtained a patent on their work, christened the Kinétograph, and on 2 December Méliès created the Star Film trademark, with the slogan "The Whole World Within Reach."

== American branch ==
The American branch of the company was managed by Méliès' older brother Gaston Méliès and produced films in New York City, San Antonio, Texas and Santa Paula, California. Its most significant film was The Immortal Alamo (1911).

=== History ===
Georges Méliès had produced films in France, which had become popular around the world. Some distributors began infringing Méliès' work, especially in the United States. Méliès asked his brother Gaston to go to the United States and guard Méliès copyrights.

Gaston arrived in New York City in 1902 and began distributing his brother's films. By 1903, Gaston began making films himself, mostly documentaries. The films were not successful. The company moved to San Antonio looking for warmer winters and leased 20 acres including a two-story house and large barn that became the Star Film Ranch movie studio. Star Film Company was the earliest non-Texas production company to operate in Texas.

The studio had actors Edith Storey, Francis Ford, and William Clifford under contract along with writer Anne Nichols. The studio also hired local ranchers and cowboys to give its Westerns genuine character. The films were normally one reel in length with an average running time of 15 minutes. Of the 70 films made in San Antonio, only three are known to have survived.

Star Film moved to California in April 1911. Gaston originally planned to relocate to Santa Barbara but chose Santa Paula instead, perhaps because the scenery was better, or perhaps because it was less expensive. In Santa Paula, he built stages across from a resort called Sulphur Mountain Springs, where the troupe rented rooms. Financially, things started going wrong for Gaston. His popular stars, Edith Storey and William Clifford moved to other companies. His California films were not as profitable as the Texas films had been. In November 1911, Gaston met with Vitagraph Studios in New York and sold fifty percent of his company, including his brother's negatives and distribution rights.

On July 24, 1912, Gaston, his wife and a crew of 14 left for a Pacific and Asian voyage to make movies in exotic locales. Documentaries and dramas were filmed at various locations including Tahiti, Bora Bora, New Zealand, Rarotonga, Australia, Java, Cambodia and Japan. The footage was sent to New York for processing, but much of the footage arrived damaged because of the harsh conditions in which the negatives were shot or mishandling in transit. What was released met with an unappreciative audience and bad reviews in the trade press.

Gaston stopped the tour in 1913 and settled in Corsica, where he died two years later. Gaston's son Paul sold what was left of the company to General Film Company in 1917. It was believed that bad blood developed between the Méliès brothers, but recent research indicates that despite losses in the American branch, Georges received all payments he was due.

=== Selected filmography ===
- The Man with the Rubber Head (1901)
- A Trip to the Moon (1902)
- The Yacht Race (1903)
- The Impossible Voyage (1904)
- Salt on the Bird's Tail (1910)
- In the Hot Lands (1911)
- Mary's Stratagem (1911)
- The Immortal Alamo (1911)
- When the Tables Turned (1911)
- The Kiss of Mary Jane (1911)
